There are about 2,638 species of moth in Sweden. The moths (mostly nocturnal) and butterflies (mostly diurnal) together make up the taxonomic order Lepidoptera.

This is a list of moth species which have been recorded in Sweden.

Adelidae
Adela croesella (Scopoli, 1763)
Adela cuprella (Denis & Schiffermüller, 1775)
Adela reaumurella (Linnaeus, 1758)
Cauchas breviantennella Nielsen & Johansson, 1980
Cauchas fibulella (Denis & Schiffermüller, 1775)
Cauchas rufimitrella (Scopoli, 1763)
Nematopogon adansoniella (Villers, 1789)
Nematopogon magna (Zeller, 1878)
Nematopogon metaxella (Hübner, 1813)
Nematopogon pilella (Denis & Schiffermüller, 1775)
Nematopogon robertella (Clerck, 1759)
Nematopogon schwarziellus Zeller, 1839
Nematopogon swammerdamella (Linnaeus, 1758)
Nemophora amatella (Staudinger, 1892)
Nemophora bellela (Walker, 1863)
Nemophora cupriacella (Hübner, 1819)
Nemophora degeerella (Linnaeus, 1758)
Nemophora dumerilella (Duponchel, 1839)
Nemophora metallica (Poda, 1761)
Nemophora minimella (Denis & Schiffermüller, 1775)

Alucitidae
Alucita grammodactyla Zeller, 1841
Alucita hexadactyla Linnaeus, 1758
Pterotopteryx dodecadactyla Hübner, 1813

Argyresthiidae
Argyresthia abdominalis Zeller, 1839
Argyresthia albistria (Haworth, 1828)
Argyresthia aurulentella Stainton, 1849
Argyresthia bonnetella (Linnaeus, 1758)
Argyresthia brockeella (Hübner, 1813)
Argyresthia conjugella Zeller, 1839
Argyresthia curvella (Linnaeus, 1761)
Argyresthia fundella (Fischer von Röslerstamm, 1835)
Argyresthia glaucinella Zeller, 1839
Argyresthia goedartella (Linnaeus, 1758)
Argyresthia ivella (Haworth, 1828)
Argyresthia pruniella (Clerck, 1759)
Argyresthia pulchella Lienig & Zeller, 1846
Argyresthia pygmaeella (Denis & Schiffermüller, 1775)
Argyresthia retinella Zeller, 1839
Argyresthia semifusca (Haworth, 1828)
Argyresthia semitestacella (Curtis, 1833)
Argyresthia sorbiella (Treitschke, 1833)
Argyresthia spinosella Stainton, 1849
Argyresthia submontana Frey, 1871
Argyresthia arceuthina Zeller, 1839
Argyresthia bergiella (Ratzeburg, 1840)
Argyresthia dilectella Zeller, 1847
Argyresthia glabratella (Zeller, 1847)
Argyresthia laevigatella Herrich-Schäffer, 1855
Argyresthia praecocella Zeller, 1839
Argyresthia trifasciata Staudinger, 1871

Autostichidae
Oegoconia deauratella (Herrich-Schäffer, 1854)

Batrachedridae
Batrachedra pinicolella (Zeller, 1839)
Batrachedra praeangusta (Haworth, 1828)

Bedelliidae
Bedellia somnulentella (Zeller, 1847)

Blastobasidae
Hypatopa binotella (Thunberg, 1794)
Hypatopa inunctella Zeller, 1839
Hypatopa segnella (Zeller, 1873)

Brahmaeidae
Lemonia dumi (Linnaeus, 1761)

Bucculatricidae
Bucculatrix absinthii Gartner, 1865
Bucculatrix albedinella (Zeller, 1839)
Bucculatrix artemisiella Herrich-Schäffer, 1855
Bucculatrix bechsteinella (Bechstein & Scharfenberg, 1805)
Bucculatrix cidarella (Zeller, 1839)
Bucculatrix cristatella (Zeller, 1839)
Bucculatrix demaryella (Duponchel, 1840)
Bucculatrix frangutella (Goeze, 1783)
Bucculatrix gnaphaliella (Treitschke, 1833)
Bucculatrix humiliella Herrich-Schäffer, 1855
Bucculatrix laciniatella Benander, 1931
Bucculatrix maritima Stainton, 1851
Bucculatrix nigricomella (Zeller, 1839)
Bucculatrix ratisbonensis Stainton, 1861
Bucculatrix thoracella (Thunberg, 1794)
Bucculatrix ulmella Zeller, 1848

Chimabachidae
Dasystoma salicella (Hübner, 1796)
Diurnea fagella (Denis & Schiffermüller, 1775)
Diurnea lipsiella (Denis & Schiffermüller, 1775)

Choreutidae
Anthophila fabriciana (Linnaeus, 1767)
Choreutis diana (Hübner, 1822)
Choreutis pariana (Clerck, 1759)
Prochoreutis myllerana (Fabricius, 1794)
Prochoreutis sehestediana (Fabricius, 1776)
Prochoreutis ultimana (Krulikovsky, 1909)
Tebenna bjerkandrella (Thunberg, 1784)

Coleophoridae
Augasma aeratella (Zeller, 1839)
Coleophora absinthii Wocke, 1877
Coleophora adelogrammella Zeller, 1849
Coleophora adjectella Hering, 1937
Coleophora adjunctella Hodgkinson, 1882
Coleophora adspersella Benander, 1939
Coleophora ahenella Heinemann, 1877
Coleophora albella (Thunberg, 1788)
Coleophora albicans Zeller, 1849
Coleophora albidella (Denis & Schiffermüller, 1775)
Coleophora albitarsella Zeller, 1849
Coleophora alcyonipennella (Kollar, 1832)
Coleophora alnifoliae Barasch, 1934
Coleophora alticolella Zeller, 1849
Coleophora amellivora Baldizzone, 1979
Coleophora anatipenella (Hübner, 1796)
Coleophora antennariella Herrich-Schäffer, 1861
Coleophora arctostaphyli Meder, 1934
Coleophora argentula (Stephens, 1834)
Coleophora artemisicolella Bruand, 1855
Coleophora asteris Muhlig, 1864
Coleophora atriplicis Meyrick, 1928
Coleophora badiipennella (Duponchel, 1843)
Coleophora betulella Heinemann, 1877
Coleophora binderella (Kollar, 1832)
Coleophora boreella Benander, 1939
Coleophora brevipalpella Wocke, 1874
Coleophora caelebipennella Zeller, 1839
Coleophora caespititiella Zeller, 1839
Coleophora chalcogrammella Zeller, 1839
Coleophora clypeiferella Hofmann, 1871
Coleophora colutella (Fabricius, 1794)
Coleophora conspicuella Zeller, 1849
Coleophora conyzae Zeller, 1868
Coleophora cornutella Herrich-Schäffer, 1861
Coleophora currucipennella Zeller, 1839
Coleophora deauratella Lienig & Zeller, 1846
Coleophora dianthi Herrich-Schäffer, 1855
Coleophora directella Zeller, 1849
Coleophora discordella Zeller, 1849
Coleophora expressella Klemensiewicz, 1902
Coleophora flavipennella (Duponchel, 1843)
Coleophora follicularis (Vallot, 1802)
Coleophora frischella (Linnaeus, 1758)
Coleophora fuscocuprella Herrich-Schäffer, 1855
Coleophora galbulipennella Zeller, 1838
Coleophora gallipennella (Hübner, 1796)
Coleophora genistae Stainton, 1857
Coleophora glaucicolella Wood, 1892
Coleophora glitzella Hofmann, 1869
Coleophora gnaphalii Zeller, 1839
Coleophora graminicolella Heinemann, 1876
Coleophora granulatella Zeller, 1849
Coleophora gryphipennella (Hübner, 1796)
Coleophora hackmani (Toll, 1953)
Coleophora hemerobiella (Scopoli, 1763)
Coleophora hydrolapathella Hering, 1921
Coleophora ibipennella Zeller, 1849
Coleophora idaeella Hofmann, 1869
Coleophora jaernaensis Bjorklund & Palm, 2002
Coleophora juncicolella Stainton, 1851
Coleophora kuehnella (Goeze, 1783)
Coleophora kyffhusana Petry, 1898
Coleophora laricella (Hübner, 1817)
Coleophora lassella Staudinger, 1859
Coleophora ledi Stainton, 1860
Coleophora limosipennella (Duponchel, 1843)
Coleophora lineolea (Haworth, 1828)
Coleophora lithargyrinella Zeller, 1849
Coleophora lixella Zeller, 1849
Coleophora lusciniaepennella (Treitschke, 1833)
Coleophora lutipennella (Zeller, 1838)
Coleophora maritimella Newman, 1863
Coleophora mayrella (Hübner, 1813)
Coleophora millefolii Zeller, 1849
Coleophora milvipennis Zeller, 1839
Coleophora murinella Tengstrom, 1848
Coleophora niveicostella Zeller, 1839
Coleophora nutantella Muhlig & Frey, 1857
Coleophora obscuripalpella Kanerva, 1941
Coleophora ochrea (Haworth, 1828)
Coleophora onobrychiella Zeller, 1849
Coleophora orbitella Zeller, 1849
Coleophora otidipennella (Hübner, 1817)
Coleophora paeltsaella Palmqvist & Hellberg, 1999
Coleophora pappiferella Hofmann, 1869
Coleophora paradrymidis Toll, 1949
Coleophora paripennella Zeller, 1839
Coleophora parthenogenella Falck, 2010
Coleophora partitella Zeller, 1849
Coleophora pennella (Denis & Schiffermüller, 1775)
Coleophora peri Svensson, 1976
Coleophora peribenanderi Toll, 1943
Coleophora plumbella Kanerva, 1941
Coleophora potentillae Elisha, 1885
Coleophora prunifoliae Doets, 1944
Coleophora pulmonariella Ragonot, 1874
Coleophora pyrrhulipennella Zeller, 1839
Coleophora ramosella Zeller, 1849
Coleophora salicorniae Heinemann & Wocke, 1877
Coleophora saponariella Heeger, 1848
Coleophora saturatella Stainton, 1850
Coleophora saxicolella (Duponchel, 1843)
Coleophora scabrida Toll, 1959
Coleophora serratella (Linnaeus, 1761)
Coleophora siccifolia Stainton, 1856
Coleophora solitariella Zeller, 1849
Coleophora spinella (Schrank, 1802)
Coleophora squalorella Zeller, 1849
Coleophora squamosella Stainton, 1856
Coleophora sternipennella (Zetterstedt, 1839)
Coleophora striatipennella Nylander in Tengstrom, 1848
Coleophora succursella Herrich-Schäffer, 1855
Coleophora svenssoni Baldizzone, 1985
Coleophora sylvaticella Wood, 1892
Coleophora taeniipennella Herrich-Schäffer, 1855
Coleophora tamesis Waters, 1929
Coleophora tanaceti Muhlig, 1865
Coleophora therinella Tengstrom, 1848
Coleophora thulea Johansson, 1967
Coleophora trifolii (Curtis, 1832)
Coleophora trigeminella Fuchs, 1881
Coleophora trochilella (Duponchel, 1843)
Coleophora uliginosella Glitz, 1872
Coleophora unigenella Svensson, 1966
Coleophora vacciniella Herrich-Schäffer, 1861
Coleophora versurella Zeller, 1849
Coleophora vestianella (Linnaeus, 1758)
Coleophora vibicigerella Zeller, 1839
Coleophora violacea (Strom, 1783)
Coleophora virgaureae Stainton, 1857
Coleophora vitisella Gregson, 1856
Coleophora vulnerariae Zeller, 1839
Coleophora zelleriella Heinemann, 1854
Metriotes lutarea (Haworth, 1828)

Cosmopterigidae
Cosmopterix lienigiella Zeller, 1846
Cosmopterix orichalcea Stainton, 1861
Cosmopterix scribaiella Zeller, 1850
Cosmopterix zieglerella (Hübner, 1810)
Eteobalea anonymella (Riedl, 1965)
Eteobalea tririvella (Staudinger, 1870)
Limnaecia phragmitella Stainton, 1851
Pancalia leuwenhoekella (Linnaeus, 1761)
Pancalia schwarzella (Fabricius, 1798)
Sorhagenia janiszewskae Riedl, 1962
Sorhagenia lophyrella (Douglas, 1846)
Sorhagenia rhamniella (Zeller, 1839)

Cossidae
Acossus terebra (Denis & Schiffermüller, 1775)
Cossus cossus (Linnaeus, 1758)
Phragmataecia castaneae (Hübner, 1790)
Zeuzera pyrina (Linnaeus, 1761)

Crambidae
Acentria ephemerella (Denis & Schiffermüller, 1775)
Agriphila biarmicus (Tengstrom, 1865)
Agriphila deliella (Hübner, 1813)
Agriphila geniculea (Haworth, 1811)
Agriphila inquinatella (Denis & Schiffermüller, 1775)
Agriphila latistria (Haworth, 1811)
Agriphila poliellus (Treitschke, 1832)
Agriphila selasella (Hübner, 1813)
Agriphila straminella (Denis & Schiffermüller, 1775)
Agriphila tristella (Denis & Schiffermüller, 1775)
Agrotera nemoralis (Scopoli, 1763)
Anania coronata (Hufnagel, 1767)
Anania crocealis (Hübner, 1796)
Anania funebris (Strom, 1768)
Anania fuscalis (Denis & Schiffermüller, 1775)
Anania hortulata (Linnaeus, 1758)
Anania lancealis (Denis & Schiffermüller, 1775)
Anania perlucidalis (Hübner, 1809)
Anania stachydalis (Germar, 1821)
Anania terrealis (Treitschke, 1829)
Anania verbascalis (Denis & Schiffermüller, 1775)
Antigastra catalaunalis (Duponchel, 1833)
Atralata albofascialis (Treitschke, 1829)
Calamotropha paludella (Hübner, 1824)
Cataclysta lemnata (Linnaeus, 1758)
Catoptria falsella (Denis & Schiffermüller, 1775)
Catoptria fulgidella (Hübner, 1813)
Catoptria furcatellus (Zetterstedt, 1839)
Catoptria lythargyrella (Hübner, 1796)
Catoptria maculalis (Zetterstedt, 1839)
Catoptria margaritella (Denis & Schiffermüller, 1775)
Catoptria osthelderi (Lattin, 1950)
Catoptria permutatellus (Herrich-Schäffer, 1848)
Catoptria pinella (Linnaeus, 1758)
Catoptria verellus (Zincken, 1817)
Chilo phragmitella (Hübner, 1805)
Chrysoteuchia culmella (Linnaeus, 1758)
Crambus alienellus Germar & Kaulfuss, 1817
Crambus ericella (Hübner, 1813)
Crambus hamella (Thunberg, 1788)
Crambus heringiellus Herrich-Schäffer, 1848
Crambus lathoniellus (Zincken, 1817)
Crambus pascuella (Linnaeus, 1758)
Crambus perlella (Scopoli, 1763)
Crambus pratella (Linnaeus, 1758)
Crambus silvella (Hübner, 1813)
Crambus uliginosellus Zeller, 1850
Cynaeda dentalis (Denis & Schiffermüller, 1775)
Diasemia reticularis (Linnaeus, 1761)
Dolicharthria punctalis (Denis & Schiffermüller, 1775)
Donacaula forficella (Thunberg, 1794)
Donacaula mucronella (Denis & Schiffermüller, 1775)
Elophila nymphaeata (Linnaeus, 1758)
Epascestria pustulalis (Hübner, 1823)
Euchromius ocellea (Haworth, 1811)
Eudonia aequalis Kyrki & Svensson, 1986
Eudonia alpina (Curtis, 1850)
Eudonia lacustrata (Panzer, 1804)
Eudonia laetella (Zeller, 1846)
Eudonia mercurella (Linnaeus, 1758)
Eudonia murana (Curtis, 1827)
Eudonia pallida (Curtis, 1827)
Eudonia sudetica (Zeller, 1839)
Eudonia truncicolella (Stainton, 1849)
Evergestis aenealis (Denis & Schiffermüller, 1775)
Evergestis extimalis (Scopoli, 1763)
Evergestis forficalis (Linnaeus, 1758)
Evergestis frumentalis (Linnaeus, 1761)
Evergestis limbata (Linnaeus, 1767)
Evergestis pallidata (Hufnagel, 1767)
Gesneria centuriella (Denis & Schiffermüller, 1775)
Heliothela wulfeniana (Scopoli, 1763)
Loxostege commixtalis (Walker, 1866)
Loxostege ephippialis (Zetterstedt, 1839)
Loxostege manualis (Geyer, 1832)
Loxostege sticticalis (Linnaeus, 1761)
Loxostege turbidalis (Treitschke, 1829)
Mecyna flavalis (Denis & Schiffermüller, 1775)
Metaxmeste phrygialis (Hübner, 1796)
Metaxmeste schrankiana (Hochenwarth, 1785)
Nascia cilialis (Hübner, 1796)
Nomophila noctuella (Denis & Schiffermüller, 1775)
Nymphula nitidulata (Hufnagel, 1767)
Ostrinia nubilalis (Hübner, 1796)
Ostrinia palustralis (Hübner, 1796)
Palpita vitrealis (Rossi, 1794)
Parapoynx stratiotata (Linnaeus, 1758)
Paratalanta hyalinalis (Hübner, 1796)
Paratalanta pandalis (Hübner, 1825)
Pediasia aridella (Thunberg, 1788)
Pediasia contaminella (Hübner, 1796)
Pediasia fascelinella (Hübner, 1813)
Pediasia truncatellus (Zetterstedt, 1839)
Platytes alpinella (Hübner, 1813)
Platytes cerussella (Denis & Schiffermüller, 1775)
Pleuroptya ruralis (Scopoli, 1763)
Psammotis pulveralis (Hübner, 1796)
Pyrausta aerealis (Hübner, 1793)
Pyrausta aurata (Scopoli, 1763)
Pyrausta cingulata (Linnaeus, 1758)
Pyrausta despicata (Scopoli, 1763)
Pyrausta nigrata (Scopoli, 1763)
Pyrausta ostrinalis (Hübner, 1796)
Pyrausta porphyralis (Denis & Schiffermüller, 1775)
Pyrausta purpuralis (Linnaeus, 1758)
Pyrausta sanguinalis (Linnaeus, 1767)
Schoenobius gigantella (Denis & Schiffermüller, 1775)
Scoparia ambigualis (Treitschke, 1829)
Scoparia ancipitella (La Harpe, 1855)
Scoparia basistrigalis Knaggs, 1866
Scoparia conicella (La Harpe, 1863)
Scoparia pyralella (Denis & Schiffermüller, 1775)
Scoparia subfusca Haworth, 1811
Sitochroa palealis (Denis & Schiffermüller, 1775)
Sitochroa verticalis (Linnaeus, 1758)
Synclera traducalis (Zeller, 1852)
Thisanotia chrysonuchella (Scopoli, 1763)
Udea accolalis (Zeller, 1867)
Udea decrepitalis (Herrich-Schäffer, 1848)
Udea ferrugalis (Hübner, 1796)
Udea hamalis (Thunberg, 1788)
Udea inquinatalis (Lienig & Zeller, 1846)
Udea lutealis (Hübner, 1809)
Udea nebulalis (Hübner, 1796)
Udea olivalis (Denis & Schiffermüller, 1775)
Udea prunalis (Denis & Schiffermüller, 1775)

Douglasiidae
Klimeschia transversella (Zeller, 1839)
Tinagma anchusella (Benander, 1936)
Tinagma dryadis Staudinger, 1872
Tinagma ocnerostomella (Stainton, 1850)
Tinagma perdicella Zeller, 1839

Drepanidae
Achlya flavicornis (Linnaeus, 1758)
Cilix glaucata (Scopoli, 1763)
Cymatophorina diluta (Denis & Schiffermüller, 1775)
Drepana curvatula (Borkhausen, 1790)
Drepana falcataria (Linnaeus, 1758)
Falcaria lacertinaria (Linnaeus, 1758)
Habrosyne pyritoides (Hufnagel, 1766)
Ochropacha duplaris (Linnaeus, 1761)
Polyploca ridens (Fabricius, 1787)
Sabra harpagula (Esper, 1786)
Tethea ocularis (Linnaeus, 1767)
Tethea or (Denis & Schiffermüller, 1775)
Tetheella fluctuosa (Hübner, 1803)
Thyatira batis (Linnaeus, 1758)
Watsonalla binaria (Hufnagel, 1767)
Watsonalla cultraria (Fabricius, 1775)

Elachistidae
Agonopterix alstromeriana (Clerck, 1759)
Agonopterix angelicella (Hübner, 1813)
Agonopterix arctica (Strand, 1902)
Agonopterix arenella (Denis & Schiffermüller, 1775)
Agonopterix assimilella (Treitschke, 1832)
Agonopterix astrantiae (Heinemann, 1870)
Agonopterix atomella (Denis & Schiffermüller, 1775)
Agonopterix bipunctosa (Curtis, 1850)
Agonopterix broennoeensis (Strand, 1920)
Agonopterix capreolella (Zeller, 1839)
Agonopterix ciliella (Stainton, 1849)
Agonopterix conterminella (Zeller, 1839)
Agonopterix curvipunctosa (Haworth, 1811)
Agonopterix heracliana (Linnaeus, 1758)
Agonopterix hypericella (Hübner, 1817)
Agonopterix kaekeritziana (Linnaeus, 1767)
Agonopterix laterella (Denis & Schiffermüller, 1775)
Agonopterix liturosa (Haworth, 1811)
Agonopterix multiplicella (Erschoff, 1877)
Agonopterix nervosa (Haworth, 1811)
Agonopterix ocellana (Fabricius, 1775)
Agonopterix pallorella (Zeller, 1839)
Agonopterix parilella (Treitschke, 1835)
Agonopterix propinquella (Treitschke, 1835)
Agonopterix purpurea (Haworth, 1811)
Agonopterix quadripunctata (Wocke, 1857)
Agonopterix scopariella (Heinemann, 1870)
Agonopterix selini (Heinemann, 1870)
Agonopterix subpropinquella (Stainton, 1849)
Agonopterix yeatiana (Fabricius, 1781)
Anchinia cristalis (Scopoli, 1763)
Anchinia daphnella (Denis & Schiffermüller, 1775)
Blastodacna atra (Haworth, 1828)
Blastodacna hellerella (Duponchel, 1838)
Chrysoclista lathamella (T. B. Fletcher, 1936)
Chrysoclista linneella (Clerck, 1759)
Depressaria albipunctella (Denis & Schiffermüller, 1775)
Depressaria artemisiae Nickerl, 1864
Depressaria badiella (Hübner, 1796)
Depressaria chaerophylli Zeller, 1839
Depressaria daucella (Denis & Schiffermüller, 1775)
Depressaria depressana (Fabricius, 1775)
Depressaria douglasella Stainton, 1849
Depressaria emeritella Stainton, 1849
Depressaria leucocephala Snellen, 1884
Depressaria libanotidella Schlager, 1849
Depressaria nemolella Svensson, 1982
Depressaria olerella Zeller, 1854
Depressaria pimpinellae Zeller, 1839
Depressaria pulcherrimella Stainton, 1849
Depressaria radiella (Goeze, 1783)
Depressaria silesiaca Heinemann, 1870
Depressaria sordidatella Tengstrom, 1848
Depressaria ultimella Stainton, 1849
Dystebenna stephensi (Stainton, 1849)
Elachista adscitella Stainton, 1851
Elachista argentella (Clerck, 1759)
Elachista bedellella (Sircom, 1848)
Elachista bisulcella (Duponchel, 1843)
Elachista chrysodesmella Zeller, 1850
Elachista cingillella (Herrich-Schäffer, 1855)
Elachista dispilella Zeller, 1839
Elachista elsaella Traugott-Olsen, 1988
Elachista festucicolella Zeller, 1859
Elachista gangabella Zeller, 1850
Elachista lugdunensis Frey, 1859
Elachista obliquella Stainton, 1854
Elachista pullicomella Zeller, 1839
Elachista subalbidella Schlager, 1847
Elachista subocellea (Stephens, 1834)
Elachista triatomea (Haworth, 1828)
Elachista unifasciella (Haworth, 1828)
Elachista abiskoella Bengtsson, 1977
Elachista albidella Nylander, 1848
Elachista albifrontella (Hübner, 1817)
Elachista alpinella Stainton, 1854
Elachista anserinella Zeller, 1839
Elachista apicipunctella Stainton, 1849
Elachista atricomella Stainton, 1849
Elachista biatomella (Stainton, 1848)
Elachista bifasciella Treitschke, 1833
Elachista canapennella (Hübner, 1813)
Elachista cinereopunctella (Haworth, 1828)
Elachista compsa Traugott-Olsen, 1974
Elachista consortella Stainton, 1851
Elachista deriventa Kaila & Mutanen, 2008
Elachista diederichsiella E. Hering, 1889
Elachista elegans Frey, 1859
Elachista eleochariella Stainton, 1851
Elachista eskoi Kyrki & Karvonen, 1985
Elachista exactella (Herrich-Schäffer, 1855)
Elachista excelsicola Braun, 1948
Elachista freyerella (Hübner, 1825)
Elachista geminatella (Herrich-Schäffer, 1855)
Elachista gleichenella (Fabricius, 1781)
Elachista humilis Zeller, 1850
Elachista kebneella (Traugott-Olsen & Nielsen, 1977)
Elachista kilmunella Stainton, 1849
Elachista krogeri Svensson, 1976
Elachista luticomella Zeller, 1839
Elachista maculicerusella (Bruand, 1859)
Elachista nielswolffi Svensson, 1976
Elachista nobilella Zeller, 1839
Elachista occidentalis Frey, 1882
Elachista orstadii N. Palm, 1943
Elachista poae Stainton, 1855
Elachista pomerana Frey, 1870
Elachista quadripunctella (Hübner, 1825)
Elachista scirpi Stainton, 1887
Elachista serricornis Stainton, 1854
Elachista stabilella Stainton, 1858
Elachista subnigrella Douglas, 1853
Elachista tengstromi Kaila, Bengtsson, Sulcs & Junnilainen, 2001
Elachista tetragonella (Herrich-Schäffer, 1855)
Elachista trapeziella Stainton, 1849
Elachista utonella Frey, 1856
Elachista vonschantzi Svensson, 1976
Elachista zernyi Hartig, 1941
Ethmia bipunctella (Fabricius, 1775)
Ethmia dodecea (Haworth, 1828)
Ethmia pusiella (Linnaeus, 1758)
Ethmia pyrausta (Pallas, 1771)
Ethmia quadrillella (Goeze, 1783)
Ethmia terminella T. B. Fletcher, 1938
Exaeretia ciniflonella (Lienig & Zeller, 1846)
Exaeretia praeustella (Rebel, 1917)
Exaeretia allisella Stainton, 1849
Heinemannia festivella (Denis & Schiffermüller, 1775)
Heinemannia laspeyrella (Hübner, 1796)
Hypercallia citrinalis (Scopoli, 1763)
Levipalpus hepatariella (Lienig & Zeller, 1846)
Luquetia lobella (Denis & Schiffermüller, 1775)
Orophia ferrugella (Denis & Schiffermüller, 1775)
Perittia farinella (Thunberg, 1794)
Perittia herrichiella (Herrich-Schäffer, 1855)
Perittia obscurepunctella (Stainton, 1848)
Semioscopis avellanella (Hübner, 1793)
Semioscopis oculella (Thunberg, 1794)
Semioscopis steinkellneriana (Denis & Schiffermüller, 1775)
Semioscopis strigulana (Denis & Schiffermüller, 1775)
Spuleria flavicaput (Haworth, 1828)
Stephensia brunnichella (Linnaeus, 1767)
Telechrysis tripuncta (Haworth, 1828)

Endromidae
Endromis versicolora (Linnaeus, 1758)

Epermeniidae
Epermenia chaerophyllella (Goeze, 1783)
Epermenia falciformis (Haworth, 1828)
Epermenia illigerella (Hübner, 1813)
Epermenia farreni (Walsingham, 1894)
Epermenia profugella (Stainton, 1856)
Phaulernis dentella (Zeller, 1839)
Phaulernis fulviguttella (Zeller, 1839)

Erebidae
Acerbia alpina (Quensel, 1802)
Arctia caja (Linnaeus, 1758)
Arctia villica (Linnaeus, 1758)
Arctornis l-nigrum (Muller, 1764)
Atolmis rubricollis (Linnaeus, 1758)
Callimorpha dominula (Linnaeus, 1758)
Calliteara abietis (Denis & Schiffermüller, 1775)
Calliteara pudibunda (Linnaeus, 1758)
Calyptra thalictri (Borkhausen, 1790)
Catocala adultera Menetries, 1856
Catocala electa (Vieweg, 1790)
Catocala elocata (Esper, 1787)
Catocala fraxini (Linnaeus, 1758)
Catocala fulminea (Scopoli, 1763)
Catocala nupta (Linnaeus, 1767)
Catocala pacta (Linnaeus, 1758)
Catocala promissa (Denis & Schiffermüller, 1775)
Catocala sponsa (Linnaeus, 1767)
Colobochyla salicalis (Denis & Schiffermüller, 1775)
Coscinia cribraria (Linnaeus, 1758)
Coscinia striata (Linnaeus, 1758)
Cybosia mesomella (Linnaeus, 1758)
Diacrisia sannio (Linnaeus, 1758)
Diaphora mendica (Clerck, 1759)
Dicallomera fascelina (Linnaeus, 1758)
Dysauxes ancilla (Linnaeus, 1767)
Eilema complana (Linnaeus, 1758)
Eilema depressa (Esper, 1787)
Eilema griseola (Hübner, 1803)
Eilema lurideola (Zincken, 1817)
Eilema lutarella (Linnaeus, 1758)
Eilema palliatella (Scopoli, 1763)
Eilema pygmaeola (Doubleday, 1847)
Eilema sororcula (Hufnagel, 1766)
Eublemma minutata (Fabricius, 1794)
Euclidia mi (Clerck, 1759)
Euclidia glyphica (Linnaeus, 1758)
Euproctis chrysorrhoea (Linnaeus, 1758)
Euproctis similis (Fuessly, 1775)
Grammia quenseli (Paykull, 1791)
Grammodes stolida (Fabricius, 1775)
Herminia grisealis (Denis & Schiffermüller, 1775)
Herminia tarsicrinalis (Knoch, 1782)
Herminia tarsipennalis (Treitschke, 1835)
Holoarctia puengeleri (Bang-Haas, 1927)
Hypena crassalis (Fabricius, 1787)
Hypena lividalis (Hübner, 1796)
Hypena proboscidalis (Linnaeus, 1758)
Hypena rostralis (Linnaeus, 1758)
Hypenodes humidalis Doubleday, 1850
Hyphoraia aulica (Linnaeus, 1758)
Laelia coenosa (Hübner, 1808)
Laspeyria flexula (Denis & Schiffermüller, 1775)
Leucoma salicis (Linnaeus, 1758)
Lithosia quadra (Linnaeus, 1758)
Lygephila craccae (Denis & Schiffermüller, 1775)
Lygephila pastinum (Treitschke, 1826)
Lygephila viciae (Hübner, 1822)
Lymantria dispar (Linnaeus, 1758)
Lymantria monacha (Linnaeus, 1758)
Macrochilo cribrumalis (Hübner, 1793)
Miltochrista miniata (Forster, 1771)
Minucia lunaris (Denis & Schiffermüller, 1775)
Nudaria mundana (Linnaeus, 1761)
Orgyia antiquoides (Hübner, 1822)
Orgyia recens (Hübner, 1819)
Orgyia antiqua (Linnaeus, 1758)
Paracolax tristalis (Fabricius, 1794)
Pararctia lapponica (Thunberg, 1791)
Parascotia fuliginaria (Linnaeus, 1761)
Parasemia plantaginis (Linnaeus, 1758)
Pechipogo strigilata (Linnaeus, 1758)
Pelosia muscerda (Hufnagel, 1766)
Pelosia obtusa (Herrich-Schäffer, 1852)
Pericallia matronula (Linnaeus, 1758)
Phragmatobia fuliginosa (Linnaeus, 1758)
Phytometra viridaria (Clerck, 1759)
Polypogon tentacularia (Linnaeus, 1758)
Rhyparia purpurata (Linnaeus, 1758)
Rivula sericealis (Scopoli, 1763)
Schrankia costaestrigalis (Stephens, 1834)
Schrankia intermedialis Reid, 1972
Schrankia taenialis (Hübner, 1809)
Scoliopteryx libatrix (Linnaeus, 1758)
Setema cereola (Hübner, 1803)
Setina irrorella (Linnaeus, 1758)
Setina roscida (Denis & Schiffermüller, 1775)
Spilosoma lubricipeda (Linnaeus, 1758)
Spilosoma lutea (Hufnagel, 1766)
Spilosoma urticae (Esper, 1789)
Thumatha senex (Hübner, 1808)
Trisateles emortualis (Denis & Schiffermüller, 1775)
Tyria jacobaeae (Linnaeus, 1758)
Zanclognatha lunalis (Scopoli, 1763)

Eriocraniidae
Dyseriocrania subpurpurella (Haworth, 1828)
Eriocrania cicatricella (Zetterstedt, 1839)
Eriocrania salopiella (Stainton, 1854)
Eriocrania sangii (Wood, 1891)
Eriocrania semipurpurella (Stephens, 1835)
Eriocrania sparrmannella (Bosc, 1791)
Heringocrania unimaculella (Zetterstedt, 1839)
Paracrania chrysolepidella (Zeller, 1851)

Gelechiidae
Acompsia cinerella (Clerck, 1759)
Acompsia subpunctella Svensson, 1966
Altenia perspersella (Wocke, 1862)
Altenia scriptella (Hübner, 1796)
Anacampsis blattariella (Hübner, 1796)
Anacampsis fuscella (Eversmann, 1844)
Anacampsis populella (Clerck, 1759)
Anacampsis scintillella (Fischer von Röslerstamm, 1841)
Anacampsis temerella (Lienig & Zeller, 1846)
Anarsia lineatella Zeller, 1839
Anarsia spartiella (Schrank, 1802)
Apodia bifractella (Duponchel, 1843)
Aproaerema anthyllidella (Hübner, 1813)
Argolamprotes micella (Denis & Schiffermüller, 1775)
Aristotelia brizella (Treitschke, 1833)
Aristotelia ericinella (Zeller, 1839)
Aristotelia heliacella (Herrich-Schäffer, 1854)
Aristotelia subdecurtella (Stainton, 1859)
Aroga velocella (Duponchel, 1838)
Athrips amoenella (Frey, 1882)
Athrips mouffetella (Linnaeus, 1758)
Athrips pruinosella (Lienig & Zeller, 1846)
Athrips tetrapunctella (Thunberg, 1794)
Brachmia blandella (Fabricius, 1798)
Brachmia dimidiella (Denis & Schiffermüller, 1775)
Brachmia inornatella (Douglas, 1850)
Bryotropha affinis (Haworth, 1828)
Bryotropha boreella (Douglas, 1851)
Bryotropha desertella (Douglas, 1850)
Bryotropha galbanella (Zeller, 1839)
Bryotropha plantariella (Tengstrom, 1848)
Bryotropha purpurella (Zetterstedt, 1839)
Bryotropha senectella (Zeller, 1839)
Bryotropha similis (Stainton, 1854)
Bryotropha terrella (Denis & Schiffermüller, 1775)
Bryotropha umbrosella (Zeller, 1839)
Carpatolechia alburnella (Zeller, 1839)
Carpatolechia decorella (Haworth, 1812)
Carpatolechia epomidella (Tengstrom, 1869)
Carpatolechia fugitivella (Zeller, 1839)
Carpatolechia notatella (Hübner, 1813)
Carpatolechia proximella (Hübner, 1796)
Caryocolum alsinella (Zeller, 1868)
Caryocolum amaurella (M. Hering, 1924)
Caryocolum blandella (Douglas, 1852)
Caryocolum blandelloides Karsholt, 1981
Caryocolum blandulella (Tutt, 1887)
Caryocolum cassella (Walker, 1864)
Caryocolum cauligenella (Schmid, 1863)
Caryocolum fischerella (Treitschke, 1833)
Caryocolum fraternella (Douglas, 1851)
Caryocolum huebneri (Haworth, 1828)
Caryocolum junctella (Douglas, 1851)
Caryocolum kroesmanniella (Herrich-Schäffer, 1854)
Caryocolum marmorea (Haworth, 1828)
Caryocolum petrophila (Preissecker, 1914)
Caryocolum petryi (O. Hofmann, 1899)
Caryocolum proxima (Haworth, 1828)
Caryocolum pullatella (Tengstrom, 1848)
Caryocolum schleichi (Christoph, 1872)
Caryocolum tischeriella (Zeller, 1839)
Caryocolum tricolorella (Haworth, 1812)
Caryocolum vicinella (Douglas, 1851)
Caryocolum viscariella (Stainton, 1855)
Chionodes continuella (Zeller, 1839)
Chionodes distinctella (Zeller, 1839)
Chionodes electella (Zeller, 1839)
Chionodes fumatella (Douglas, 1850)
Chionodes holosericella (Herrich-Schäffer, 1854)
Chionodes ignorantella (Herrich-Schäffer, 1854)
Chionodes luctuella (Hübner, 1793)
Chionodes lugubrella (Fabricius, 1794)
Chionodes nubilella (Zetterstedt, 1839)
Chionodes tragicella (Heyden, 1865)
Chionodes viduella (Fabricius, 1794)
Chionodes violacea (Tengstrom, 1848)
Chrysoesthia drurella (Fabricius, 1775)
Chrysoesthia sexguttella (Thunberg, 1794)
Dactylotula kinkerella (Snellen, 1876)
Dichomeris alacella (Zeller, 1839)
Dichomeris juniperella (Linnaeus, 1761)
Dichomeris latipennella (Rebel, 1937)
Dichomeris limosellus (Schlager, 1849)
Dichomeris marginella (Fabricius, 1781)
Eulamprotes atrella (Denis & Schiffermüller, 1775)
Eulamprotes plumbella (Heinemann, 1870)
Eulamprotes superbella (Zeller, 1839)
Eulamprotes unicolorella (Duponchel, 1843)
Eulamprotes wilkella (Linnaeus, 1758)
Exoteleia dodecella (Linnaeus, 1758)
Filatima incomptella (Herrich-Schäffer, 1854)
Filatima ukrainica Piskunov, 1971
Gelechia cuneatella Douglas, 1852
Gelechia hippophaella (Schrank, 1802)
Gelechia muscosella Zeller, 1839
Gelechia nigra (Haworth, 1828)
Gelechia rhombella (Denis & Schiffermüller, 1775)
Gelechia sabinellus (Zeller, 1839)
Gelechia scotinella Herrich-Schäffer, 1854
Gelechia sestertiella Herrich-Schäffer, 1854
Gelechia sororculella (Hübner, 1817)
Gelechia turpella (Denis & Schiffermüller, 1775)
Gnorimoschema epithymella (Staudinger, 1859)
Gnorimoschema herbichii (Nowicki, 1864)
Gnorimoschema nordlandicolella (Strand, 1902)
Gnorimoschema valesiella (Staudinger, 1877)
Helcystogramma lineolella (Zeller, 1839)
Helcystogramma lutatella (Herrich-Schäffer, 1854)
Helcystogramma rufescens (Haworth, 1828)
Hypatima rhomboidella (Linnaeus, 1758)
Isophrictis anthemidella (Wocke, 1871)
Isophrictis striatella (Denis & Schiffermüller, 1775)
Klimeschiopsis kiningerella (Duponchel, 1843)
Mesophleps silacella (Hübner, 1796)
Metzneria aestivella (Zeller, 1839)
Metzneria aprilella (Herrich-Schäffer, 1854)
Metzneria ehikeella Gozmany, 1954
Metzneria lappella (Linnaeus, 1758)
Metzneria metzneriella (Stainton, 1851)
Metzneria neuropterella (Zeller, 1839)
Metzneria santolinella (Amsel, 1936)
Mirificarma lentiginosella (Zeller, 1839)
Mirificarma mulinella (Zeller, 1839)
Monochroa arundinetella (Boyd, 1857)
Monochroa conspersella (Herrich-Schäffer, 1854)
Monochroa cytisella (Curtis, 1837)
Monochroa elongella (Heinemann, 1870)
Monochroa ferrea (Frey, 1870)
Monochroa hornigi (Staudinger, 1883)
Monochroa inflexella Svensson, 1992
Monochroa lucidella (Stephens, 1834)
Monochroa lutulentella (Zeller, 1839)
Monochroa niphognatha (Gozmany, 1953)
Monochroa palustrellus (Douglas, 1850)
Monochroa rumicetella (O. Hofmann, 1868)
Monochroa saltenella (Benander, 1928)
Monochroa sepicolella (Herrich-Schäffer, 1854)
Monochroa servella (Zeller, 1839)
Monochroa suffusella (Douglas, 1850)
Monochroa tenebrella (Hübner, 1817)
Monochroa tetragonella (Stainton, 1885)
Neofaculta ericetella (Geyer, 1832)
Neofaculta infernella (Herrich-Schäffer, 1854)
Neofriseria peliella (Treitschke, 1835)
Neofriseria singula (Staudinger, 1876)
Neotelphusa sequax (Haworth, 1828)
Nothris lemniscellus (Zeller, 1839)
Nothris verbascella (Denis & Schiffermüller, 1775)
Parachronistis albiceps (Zeller, 1839)
Pexicopia malvella (Hübner, 1805)
Platyedra subcinerea (Haworth, 1828)
Prolita sexpunctella (Fabricius, 1794)
Prolita solutella (Zeller, 1839)
Psamathocrita osseella (Stainton, 1860)
Pseudotelphusa paripunctella (Thunberg, 1794)
Pseudotelphusa scalella (Scopoli, 1763)
Psoricoptera gibbosella (Zeller, 1839)
Psoricoptera speciosella Teich, 1893
Ptocheuusa inopella (Zeller, 1839)
Recurvaria leucatella (Clerck, 1759)
Recurvaria nanella (Denis & Schiffermüller, 1775)
Scrobipalpa acuminatella (Sircom, 1850)
Scrobipalpa artemisiella (Treitschke, 1833)
Scrobipalpa atriplicella (Fischer von Röslerstamm, 1841)
Scrobipalpa clintoni Povolny, 1968
Scrobipalpa murinella (Duponchel, 1843)
Scrobipalpa nitentella (Fuchs, 1902)
Scrobipalpa obsoletella (Fischer von Röslerstamm, 1841)
Scrobipalpa pauperella (Heinemann, 1870)
Scrobipalpa proclivella (Fuchs, 1886)
Scrobipalpa salicorniae (E. Hering, 1889)
Scrobipalpa samadensis (Pfaffenzeller, 1870)
Scrobipalpa stangei (E. Hering, 1889)
Scrobipalpopsis petasitis (Pfaffenzeller, 1867)
Scrobipalpula diffluella (Frey, 1870)
Scrobipalpula psilella (Herrich-Schäffer, 1854)
Scrobipalpula tussilaginis (Stainton, 1867)
Sophronia chilonella (Treitschke, 1833)
Sophronia gelidella Nordman, 1941
Sophronia humerella (Denis & Schiffermüller, 1775)
Sophronia semicostella (Hübner, 1813)
Sophronia sicariellus (Zeller, 1839)
Stenolechia gemmella (Linnaeus, 1758)
Stomopteryx remissella (Zeller, 1847)
Syncopacma cinctella (Clerck, 1759)
Syncopacma karvoneni (Hackman, 1950)
Syncopacma sangiella (Stainton, 1863)
Syncopacma suecicella (Wolff, 1958)
Syncopacma taeniolella (Zeller, 1839)
Syncopacma wormiella (Wolff, 1958)
Teleiodes flavimaculella (Herrich-Schäffer, 1854)
Teleiodes luculella (Hübner, 1813)
Teleiodes saltuum (Zeller, 1878)
Teleiodes vulgella (Denis & Schiffermüller, 1775)
Teleiodes wagae (Nowicki, 1860)
Teleiopsis diffinis (Haworth, 1828)
Thiotricha subocellea (Stephens, 1834)
Xystophora carchariella (Zeller, 1839)
Xystophora pulveratella (Herrich-Schäffer, 1854)

Geometridae
Abraxas grossulariata (Linnaeus, 1758)
Abraxas sylvata (Scopoli, 1763)
Acasis appensata (Eversmann, 1842)
Acasis viretata (Hübner, 1799)
Aethalura punctulata (Denis & Schiffermüller, 1775)
Agriopis aurantiaria (Hübner, 1799)
Agriopis leucophaearia (Denis & Schiffermüller, 1775)
Agriopis marginaria (Fabricius, 1776)
Alcis jubata (Thunberg, 1788)
Alcis repandata (Linnaeus, 1758)
Alsophila aescularia (Denis & Schiffermüller, 1775)
Angerona prunaria (Linnaeus, 1758)
Anticlea derivata (Denis & Schiffermüller, 1775)
Anticollix sparsata (Treitschke, 1828)
Apeira syringaria (Linnaeus, 1758)
Aplocera efformata (Guenee, 1858)
Aplocera plagiata (Linnaeus, 1758)
Aplocera praeformata (Hübner, 1826)
Apocheima hispidaria (Denis & Schiffermüller, 1775)
Archiearis parthenias (Linnaeus, 1761)
Arichanna melanaria (Linnaeus, 1758)
Asthena albulata (Hufnagel, 1767)
Baptria tibiale (Esper, 1791)
Biston betularia (Linnaeus, 1758)
Biston strataria (Hufnagel, 1767)
Boudinotiana notha (Hübner, 1803)
Bupalus piniaria (Linnaeus, 1758)
Cabera exanthemata (Scopoli, 1763)
Cabera pusaria (Linnaeus, 1758)
Campaea margaritaria (Linnaeus, 1761)
Camptogramma bilineata (Linnaeus, 1758)
Carsia sororiata (Hübner, 1813)
Catarhoe cuculata (Hufnagel, 1767)
Catarhoe rubidata (Denis & Schiffermüller, 1775)
Cepphis advenaria (Hübner, 1790)
Charissa obscurata (Denis & Schiffermüller, 1775)
Chesias legatella (Denis & Schiffermüller, 1775)
Chesias rufata (Fabricius, 1775)
Chiasmia clathrata (Linnaeus, 1758)
Chlorissa viridata (Linnaeus, 1758)
Chloroclysta miata (Linnaeus, 1758)
Chloroclysta siterata (Hufnagel, 1767)
Chloroclystis v-ata (Haworth, 1809)
Cidaria fulvata (Forster, 1771)
Cleora cinctaria (Denis & Schiffermüller, 1775)
Cleorodes lichenaria (Hufnagel, 1767)
Coenocalpe lapidata (Hübner, 1809)
Colostygia aptata (Hübner, 1813)
Colostygia olivata (Denis & Schiffermüller, 1775)
Colostygia pectinataria (Knoch, 1781)
Colostygia turbata (Hübner, 1799)
Colotois pennaria (Linnaeus, 1761)
Comibaena bajularia (Denis & Schiffermüller, 1775)
Cosmorhoe ocellata (Linnaeus, 1758)
Costaconvexa polygrammata (Borkhausen, 1794)
Crocallis elinguaria (Linnaeus, 1758)
Cyclophora linearia (Hübner, 1799)
Cyclophora porata (Linnaeus, 1767)
Cyclophora punctaria (Linnaeus, 1758)
Cyclophora albipunctata (Hufnagel, 1767)
Cyclophora annularia (Fabricius, 1775)
Cyclophora pendularia (Clerck, 1759)
Cyclophora puppillaria (Hübner, 1799)
Cyclophora quercimontaria (Bastelberger, 1897)
Deileptenia ribeata (Clerck, 1759)
Dyscia fagaria (Thunberg, 1784)
Dysstroma citrata (Linnaeus, 1761)
Dysstroma infuscata (Tengstrom, 1869)
Dysstroma latefasciata (Blocker, 1908)
Dysstroma truncata (Hufnagel, 1767)
Earophila badiata (Denis & Schiffermüller, 1775)
Ecliptopera capitata (Herrich-Schäffer, 1839)
Ecliptopera silaceata (Denis & Schiffermüller, 1775)
Ectropis crepuscularia (Denis & Schiffermüller, 1775)
Electrophaes corylata (Thunberg, 1792)
Elophos vittaria (Thunberg, 1788)
Ematurga atomaria (Linnaeus, 1758)
Ennomos alniaria (Linnaeus, 1758)
Ennomos autumnaria (Werneburg, 1859)
Ennomos erosaria (Denis & Schiffermüller, 1775)
Ennomos fuscantaria (Haworth, 1809)
Ennomos quercinaria (Hufnagel, 1767)
Entephria caesiata (Denis & Schiffermüller, 1775)
Entephria flavicinctata (Hübner, 1813)
Entephria nobiliaria (Herrich-Schäffer, 1852)
Entephria polata (Duponchel, 1830)
Entephria punctipes (Curtis, 1835)
Epione repandaria (Hufnagel, 1767)
Epione vespertaria (Linnaeus, 1767)
Epirranthis diversata (Denis & Schiffermüller, 1775)
Epirrhoe alternata (Muller, 1764)
Epirrhoe galiata (Denis & Schiffermüller, 1775)
Epirrhoe hastulata (Hübner, 1790)
Epirrhoe pupillata (Thunberg, 1788)
Epirrhoe rivata (Hübner, 1813)
Epirrhoe tristata (Linnaeus, 1758)
Epirrita autumnata (Borkhausen, 1794)
Epirrita christyi (Allen, 1906)
Epirrita dilutata (Denis & Schiffermüller, 1775)
Erannis defoliaria (Clerck, 1759)
Euchoeca nebulata (Scopoli, 1763)
Eulithis mellinata (Fabricius, 1787)
Eulithis populata (Linnaeus, 1758)
Eulithis prunata (Linnaeus, 1758)
Eulithis pyropata (Hübner, 1809)
Eulithis testata (Linnaeus, 1761)
Euphyia biangulata (Haworth, 1809)
Euphyia unangulata (Haworth, 1809)
Eupithecia abbreviata Stephens, 1831
Eupithecia abietaria (Goeze, 1781)
Eupithecia absinthiata (Clerck, 1759)
Eupithecia actaeata Walderdorff, 1869
Eupithecia analoga Djakonov, 1926
Eupithecia assimilata Doubleday, 1856
Eupithecia cauchiata (Duponchel, 1831)
Eupithecia centaureata (Denis & Schiffermüller, 1775)
Eupithecia conterminata (Lienig, 1846)
Eupithecia denotata (Hübner, 1813)
Eupithecia distinctaria Herrich-Schäffer, 1848
Eupithecia dodoneata Guenee, 1858
Eupithecia egenaria Herrich-Schäffer, 1848
Eupithecia exiguata (Hübner, 1813)
Eupithecia fennoscandica Knaben, 1949
Eupithecia gelidata Moschler, 1860
Eupithecia haworthiata Doubleday, 1856
Eupithecia icterata (de Villers, 1789)
Eupithecia immundata (Lienig, 1846)
Eupithecia indigata (Hübner, 1813)
Eupithecia innotata (Hufnagel, 1767)
Eupithecia insigniata (Hübner, 1790)
Eupithecia intricata (Zetterstedt, 1839)
Eupithecia inturbata (Hübner, 1817)
Eupithecia irriguata (Hübner, 1813)
Eupithecia lanceata (Hübner, 1825)
Eupithecia lariciata (Freyer, 1841)
Eupithecia linariata (Denis & Schiffermüller, 1775)
Eupithecia millefoliata Rossler, 1866
Eupithecia nanata (Hübner, 1813)
Eupithecia ochridata Schutze & Pinker, 1968
Eupithecia orphnata W. Petersen, 1909
Eupithecia pimpinellata (Hübner, 1813)
Eupithecia plumbeolata (Haworth, 1809)
Eupithecia pusillata (Denis & Schiffermüller, 1775)
Eupithecia pygmaeata (Hübner, 1799)
Eupithecia satyrata (Hübner, 1813)
Eupithecia selinata Herrich-Schäffer, 1861
Eupithecia simpliciata (Haworth, 1809)
Eupithecia sinuosaria (Eversmann, 1848)
Eupithecia subfuscata (Haworth, 1809)
Eupithecia subumbrata (Denis & Schiffermüller, 1775)
Eupithecia succenturiata (Linnaeus, 1758)
Eupithecia tantillaria Boisduval, 1840
Eupithecia tenuiata (Hübner, 1813)
Eupithecia tripunctaria Herrich-Schäffer, 1852
Eupithecia trisignaria Herrich-Schäffer, 1848
Eupithecia valerianata (Hübner, 1813)
Eupithecia venosata (Fabricius, 1787)
Eupithecia virgaureata Doubleday, 1861
Eupithecia vulgata (Haworth, 1809)
Eustroma reticulata (Denis & Schiffermüller, 1775)
Fagivorina arenaria (Hufnagel, 1767)
Gagitodes sagittata (Fabricius, 1787)
Gandaritis pyraliata (Denis & Schiffermüller, 1775)
Geometra papilionaria (Linnaeus, 1758)
Glacies coracina (Esper, 1805)
Gnophos obfuscata (Denis & Schiffermüller, 1775)
Gymnoscelis rufifasciata (Haworth, 1809)
Hemistola chrysoprasaria (Esper, 1795)
Hemithea aestivaria (Hübner, 1789)
Heterothera serraria (Lienig, 1846)
Horisme aemulata (Hübner, 1813)
Horisme aquata (Hübner, 1813)
Horisme tersata (Denis & Schiffermüller, 1775)
Horisme vitalbata (Denis & Schiffermüller, 1775)
Hydrelia flammeolaria (Hufnagel, 1767)
Hydrelia sylvata (Denis & Schiffermüller, 1775)
Hydria cervinalis (Scopoli, 1763)
Hydria undulata (Linnaeus, 1758)
Hydriomena furcata (Thunberg, 1784)
Hydriomena impluviata (Denis & Schiffermüller, 1775)
Hydriomena ruberata (Freyer, 1831)
Hylaea fasciaria (Linnaeus, 1758)
Hypomecis punctinalis (Scopoli, 1763)
Hypomecis roboraria (Denis & Schiffermüller, 1775)
Hypoxystis pluviaria (Fabricius, 1787)
Idaea aversata (Linnaeus, 1758)
Idaea biselata (Hufnagel, 1767)
Idaea deversaria (Herrich-Schäffer, 1847)
Idaea dilutaria (Hübner, 1799)
Idaea dimidiata (Hufnagel, 1767)
Idaea emarginata (Linnaeus, 1758)
Idaea fuscovenosa (Goeze, 1781)
Idaea humiliata (Hufnagel, 1767)
Idaea inquinata (Scopoli, 1763)
Idaea muricata (Hufnagel, 1767)
Idaea ochrata (Scopoli, 1763)
Idaea pallidata (Denis & Schiffermüller, 1775)
Idaea seriata (Schrank, 1802)
Idaea serpentata (Hufnagel, 1767)
Idaea straminata (Borkhausen, 1794)
Idaea sylvestraria (Hübner, 1799)
Idaea trigeminata (Haworth, 1809)
Jodis lactearia (Linnaeus, 1758)
Jodis putata (Linnaeus, 1758)
Lampropteryx otregiata (Metcalfe, 1917)
Lampropteryx suffumata (Denis & Schiffermüller, 1775)
Larentia clavaria (Haworth, 1809)
Ligdia adustata (Denis & Schiffermüller, 1775)
Lithostege farinata (Hufnagel, 1767)
Lithostege griseata (Denis & Schiffermüller, 1775)
Lobophora halterata (Hufnagel, 1767)
Lomaspilis marginata (Linnaeus, 1758)
Lomaspilis opis Butler, 1878
Lomographa bimaculata (Fabricius, 1775)
Lomographa temerata (Denis & Schiffermüller, 1775)
Lycia hirtaria (Clerck, 1759)
Lycia lapponaria (Boisduval, 1840)
Lycia pomonaria (Hübner, 1790)
Lycia zonaria (Denis & Schiffermüller, 1775)
Lythria cruentaria (Hufnagel, 1767)
Macaria alternata (Denis & Schiffermüller, 1775)
Macaria artesiaria (Denis & Schiffermüller, 1775)
Macaria brunneata (Thunberg, 1784)
Macaria carbonaria (Clerck, 1759)
Macaria fusca (Thunberg, 1792)
Macaria liturata (Clerck, 1759)
Macaria loricaria (Eversmann, 1837)
Macaria notata (Linnaeus, 1758)
Macaria signaria (Hübner, 1809)
Macaria wauaria (Linnaeus, 1758)
Malacodea regelaria Tengstrom, 1869
Martania taeniata (Stephens, 1831)
Melanthia procellata (Denis & Schiffermüller, 1775)
Mesoleuca albicillata (Linnaeus, 1758)
Mesotype didymata (Linnaeus, 1758)
Mesotype parallelolineata (Retzius, 1783)
Nothocasis sertata (Hübner, 1817)
Nycterosea obstipata (Fabricius, 1794)
Odezia atrata (Linnaeus, 1758)
Odontopera bidentata (Clerck, 1759)
Operophtera brumata (Linnaeus, 1758)
Operophtera fagata (Scharfenberg, 1805)
Opisthograptis luteolata (Linnaeus, 1758)
Orthonama vittata (Borkhausen, 1794)
Ourapteryx sambucaria (Linnaeus, 1758)
Pachycnemia hippocastanaria (Hübner, 1799)
Paradarisa consonaria (Hübner, 1799)
Parectropis similaria (Hufnagel, 1767)
Pareulype berberata (Denis & Schiffermüller, 1775)
Pasiphila chloerata (Mabille, 1870)
Pasiphila debiliata (Hübner, 1817)
Pasiphila rectangulata (Linnaeus, 1758)
Pelurga comitata (Linnaeus, 1758)
Pennithera firmata (Hübner, 1822)
Perconia strigillaria (Hübner, 1787)
Peribatodes rhomboidaria (Denis & Schiffermüller, 1775)
Peribatodes secundaria (Denis & Schiffermüller, 1775)
Perizoma affinitata (Stephens, 1831)
Perizoma albulata (Denis & Schiffermüller, 1775)
Perizoma alchemillata (Linnaeus, 1758)
Perizoma bifaciata (Haworth, 1809)
Perizoma blandiata (Denis & Schiffermüller, 1775)
Perizoma flavofasciata (Thunberg, 1792)
Perizoma hydrata (Treitschke, 1829)
Perizoma minorata (Treitschke, 1828)
Petrophora chlorosata (Scopoli, 1763)
Phibalapteryx virgata (Hufnagel, 1767)
Phigalia pilosaria (Denis & Schiffermüller, 1775)
Philereme transversata (Hufnagel, 1767)
Philereme vetulata (Denis & Schiffermüller, 1775)
Plagodis dolabraria (Linnaeus, 1767)
Plagodis pulveraria (Linnaeus, 1758)
Plemyria rubiginata (Denis & Schiffermüller, 1775)
Pseudopanthera macularia (Linnaeus, 1758)
Pseudoterpna pruinata (Hufnagel, 1767)
Psychophora sabini (Kirby, 1824)
Pterapherapteryx sexalata (Retzius, 1783)
Rheumaptera hastata (Linnaeus, 1758)
Rheumaptera subhastata (Nolcken, 1870)
Rhodometra sacraria (Linnaeus, 1767)
Rhodostrophia vibicaria (Clerck, 1759)
Scopula floslactata (Haworth, 1809)
Scopula immutata (Linnaeus, 1758)
Scopula incanata (Linnaeus, 1758)
Scopula marginepunctata (Goeze, 1781)
Scopula ternata Schrank, 1802
Scopula decorata (Denis & Schiffermüller, 1775)
Scopula immorata (Linnaeus, 1758)
Scopula nigropunctata (Hufnagel, 1767)
Scopula ornata (Scopoli, 1763)
Scopula rubiginata (Hufnagel, 1767)
Scopula virgulata (Denis & Schiffermüller, 1775)
Scotopteryx chenopodiata (Linnaeus, 1758)
Scotopteryx luridata (Hufnagel, 1767)
Scotopteryx mucronata (Scopoli, 1763)
Selenia dentaria (Fabricius, 1775)
Selenia lunularia (Hübner, 1788)
Selenia tetralunaria (Hufnagel, 1767)
Selidosema brunnearia (de Villers, 1789)
Siona lineata (Scopoli, 1763)
Spargania luctuata (Denis & Schiffermüller, 1775)
Thalera fimbrialis (Scopoli, 1763)
Thera britannica (Turner, 1925)
Thera cognata (Thunberg, 1792)
Thera juniperata (Linnaeus, 1758)
Thera obeliscata (Hübner, 1787)
Thera variata (Denis & Schiffermüller, 1775)
Theria rupicapraria (Denis & Schiffermüller, 1775)
Timandra comae Schmidt, 1931
Timandra griseata Petersen, 1902
Trichopteryx carpinata (Borkhausen, 1794)
Trichopteryx polycommata (Denis & Schiffermüller, 1775)
Triphosa dubitata (Linnaeus, 1758)
Venusia blomeri (Curtis, 1832)
Venusia cambrica Curtis, 1839
Xanthorhoe abrasaria (Herrich-Schäffer, 1855)
Xanthorhoe annotinata (Zetterstedt, 1839)
Xanthorhoe biriviata (Borkhausen, 1794)
Xanthorhoe decoloraria (Esper, 1806)
Xanthorhoe designata (Hufnagel, 1767)
Xanthorhoe ferrugata (Clerck, 1759)
Xanthorhoe fluctuata (Linnaeus, 1758)
Xanthorhoe montanata (Denis & Schiffermüller, 1775)
Xanthorhoe quadrifasiata (Clerck, 1759)
Xanthorhoe spadicearia (Denis & Schiffermüller, 1775)

Glyphipterigidae
Acrolepia autumnitella Curtis, 1838
Acrolepiopsis assectella (Zeller, 1839)
Acrolepiopsis betulella (Curtis, 1838)
Digitivalva arnicella (Heyden, 1863)
Digitivalva reticulella (Hübner, 1796)
Digitivalva valeriella (Snellen, 1878)
Glyphipterix bergstraesserella (Fabricius, 1781)
Glyphipterix equitella (Scopoli, 1763)
Glyphipterix forsterella (Fabricius, 1781)
Glyphipterix haworthana (Stephens, 1834)
Glyphipterix schoenicolella Boyd, 1859
Glyphipterix simpliciella (Stephens, 1834)
Glyphipterix thrasonella (Scopoli, 1763)
Orthotelia sparganella (Thunberg, 1788)

Gracillariidae
Acrocercops brongniardella (Fabricius, 1798)
Aspilapteryx tringipennella (Zeller, 1839)
Callisto coffeella (Zetterstedt, 1839)
Callisto denticulella (Thunberg, 1794)
Caloptilia alchimiella (Scopoli, 1763)
Caloptilia azaleella (Brants, 1913)
Caloptilia betulicola (M. Hering, 1928)
Caloptilia cuculipennella (Hübner, 1796)
Caloptilia elongella (Linnaeus, 1761)
Caloptilia falconipennella (Hübner, 1813)
Caloptilia hemidactylella (Denis & Schiffermüller, 1775)
Caloptilia populetorum (Zeller, 1839)
Caloptilia robustella Jackh, 1972
Caloptilia rufipennella (Hübner, 1796)
Caloptilia semifascia (Haworth, 1828)
Caloptilia stigmatella (Fabricius, 1781)
Caloptilia suberinella (Tengstrom, 1848)
Calybites phasianipennella (Hübner, 1813)
Cameraria ohridella Deschka & Dimic, 1986
Euspilapteryx auroguttella Stephens, 1835
Gracillaria syringella (Fabricius, 1794)
Leucospilapteryx omissella (Stainton, 1848)
Micrurapteryx gradatella (Herrich-Schäffer, 1855)
Parectopa ononidis (Zeller, 1839)
Parornix anglicella (Stainton, 1850)
Parornix atripalpella Wahlstrom, 1979
Parornix betulae (Stainton, 1854)
Parornix carpinella (Frey, 1863)
Parornix devoniella (Stainton, 1850)
Parornix fagivora (Frey, 1861)
Parornix finitimella (Zeller, 1850)
Parornix loganella (Stainton, 1848)
Parornix polygrammella (Wocke, 1862)
Parornix scoticella (Stainton, 1850)
Parornix torquillella (Zeller, 1850)
Parornix traugotti Svensson, 1976
Phyllocnistis labyrinthella (Bjerkander, 1790)
Phyllocnistis saligna (Zeller, 1839)
Phyllocnistis unipunctella (Stephens, 1834)
Phyllonorycter acerifoliella (Zeller, 1839)
Phyllonorycter anderidae (W. Fletcher, 1885)
Phyllonorycter apparella (Herrich-Schäffer, 1855)
Phyllonorycter blancardella (Fabricius, 1781)
Phyllonorycter cavella (Zeller, 1846)
Phyllonorycter cerasicolella (Herrich-Schäffer, 1855)
Phyllonorycter connexella (Zeller, 1846)
Phyllonorycter coryli (Nicelli, 1851)
Phyllonorycter corylifoliella (Hübner, 1796)
Phyllonorycter dubitella (Herrich-Schäffer, 1855)
Phyllonorycter emberizaepenella (Bouche, 1834)
Phyllonorycter esperella (Goeze, 1783)
Phyllonorycter froelichiella (Zeller, 1839)
Phyllonorycter geniculella (Ragonot, 1874)
Phyllonorycter harrisella (Linnaeus, 1761)
Phyllonorycter heegeriella (Zeller, 1846)
Phyllonorycter hilarella (Zetterstedt, 1839)
Phyllonorycter insignitella (Zeller, 1846)
Phyllonorycter joannisi (Le Marchand, 1936)
Phyllonorycter junoniella (Zeller, 1846)
Phyllonorycter klemannella (Fabricius, 1781)
Phyllonorycter lautella (Zeller, 1846)
Phyllonorycter leucographella (Zeller, 1850)
Phyllonorycter maestingella (Muller, 1764)
Phyllonorycter nicellii (Stainton, 1851)
Phyllonorycter nigrescentella (Logan, 1851)
Phyllonorycter oxyacanthae (Frey, 1856)
Phyllonorycter pastorella (Zeller, 1846)
Phyllonorycter platani (Staudinger, 1870)
Phyllonorycter quercifoliella (Zeller, 1839)
Phyllonorycter quinqueguttella (Stainton, 1851)
Phyllonorycter rajella (Linnaeus, 1758)
Phyllonorycter roboris (Zeller, 1839)
Phyllonorycter rolandi (Svensson, 1966)
Phyllonorycter sagitella (Bjerkander, 1790)
Phyllonorycter salicicolella (Sircom, 1848)
Phyllonorycter salictella (Zeller, 1846)
Phyllonorycter schreberella (Fabricius, 1781)
Phyllonorycter sorbi (Frey, 1855)
Phyllonorycter spinicolella (Zeller, 1846)
Phyllonorycter staintoniella (Nicelli, 1853)
Phyllonorycter stettinensis (Nicelli, 1852)
Phyllonorycter strigulatella (Lienig & Zeller, 1846)
Phyllonorycter tenerella (de Joannis, 1915)
Phyllonorycter trifasciella (Haworth, 1828)
Phyllonorycter tristrigella (Haworth, 1828)
Phyllonorycter ulmifoliella (Hübner, 1817)
Povolnya leucapennella (Stephens, 1835)
Sauterina hofmanniella (Schleich, 1867)

Heliodinidae
Heliodines roesella (Linnaeus, 1758)

Heliozelidae
Antispila metallella (Denis & Schiffermüller, 1775)
Antispila treitschkiella (Fischer von Röslerstamm, 1843)
Heliozela hammoniella Sorhagen, 1885
Heliozela resplendella (Stainton, 1851)
Heliozela sericiella (Haworth, 1828)

Hepialidae
Gazoryctra fuscoargenteus (O. Bang-Haas, 1927)
Gazoryctra ganna (Hübner, 1808)
Hepialus humuli (Linnaeus, 1758)
Pharmacis fusconebulosa (DeGeer, 1778)
Pharmacis lupulina (Linnaeus, 1758)
Phymatopus hecta (Linnaeus, 1758)
Triodia sylvina (Linnaeus, 1761)

Incurvariidae
Alloclemensia mesospilella (Herrich-Schäffer, 1854)
Incurvaria circulella (Zetterstedt, 1839)
Incurvaria koerneriella (Zeller, 1839)
Incurvaria masculella (Denis & Schiffermüller, 1775)
Incurvaria oehlmanniella (Hübner, 1796)
Incurvaria pectinea Haworth, 1828
Incurvaria praelatella (Denis & Schiffermüller, 1775)
Incurvaria vetulella (Zetterstedt, 1839)
Phylloporia bistrigella (Haworth, 1828)

Lasiocampidae
Cosmotriche lobulina (Denis & Schiffermüller, 1775)
Dendrolimus pini (Linnaeus, 1758)
Eriogaster arbusculae Freyer, 1849
Eriogaster lanestris (Linnaeus, 1758)
Euthrix potatoria (Linnaeus, 1758)
Gastropacha quercifolia (Linnaeus, 1758)
Lasiocampa quercus (Linnaeus, 1758)
Lasiocampa trifolii (Denis & Schiffermüller, 1775)
Macrothylacia rubi (Linnaeus, 1758)
Malacosoma castrensis (Linnaeus, 1758)
Malacosoma neustria (Linnaeus, 1758)
Odonestis pruni (Linnaeus, 1758)
Phyllodesma ilicifolia (Linnaeus, 1758)
Poecilocampa populi (Linnaeus, 1758)
Trichiura crataegi (Linnaeus, 1758)

Limacodidae
Apoda limacodes (Hufnagel, 1766)
Heterogenea asella (Denis & Schiffermüller, 1775)

Lyonetiidae
Leucoptera laburnella (Stainton, 1851)
Leucoptera lotella (Stainton, 1859)
Leucoptera lustratella (Herrich-Schäffer, 1855)
Leucoptera malifoliella (O. Costa, 1836)
Leucoptera orobi (Stainton, 1869)
Leucoptera sinuella (Reutti, 1853)
Leucoptera spartifoliella (Hübner, 1813)
Lyonetia clerkella (Linnaeus, 1758)
Lyonetia ledi Wocke, 1859
Lyonetia prunifoliella (Hübner, 1796)
Lyonetia pulverulentella Zeller, 1839

Lypusidae
Amphisbatis incongruella (Stainton, 1849)
Lypusa maurella (Denis & Schiffermüller, 1775)
Pseudatemelia flavifrontella (Denis & Schiffermüller, 1775)
Pseudatemelia subochreella (Doubleday, 1859)
Pseudatemelia elsae Svensson, 1982
Pseudatemelia josephinae (Toll, 1956)

Micropterigidae
Micropterix aruncella (Scopoli, 1763)
Micropterix aureatella (Scopoli, 1763)
Micropterix calthella (Linnaeus, 1761)
Micropterix mansuetella Zeller, 1844
Micropterix tunbergella (Fabricius, 1787)

Momphidae
Mompha langiella (Hübner, 1796)
Mompha idaei (Zeller, 1839)
Mompha miscella (Denis & Schiffermüller, 1775)
Mompha conturbatella (Hübner, 1819)
Mompha divisella Herrich-Schäffer, 1854
Mompha epilobiella (Denis & Schiffermüller, 1775)
Mompha lacteella (Stephens, 1834)
Mompha ochraceella (Curtis, 1839)
Mompha propinquella (Stainton, 1851)
Mompha sturnipennella (Treitschke, 1833)
Mompha subbistrigella (Haworth, 1828)
Mompha locupletella (Denis & Schiffermüller, 1775)
Mompha raschkiella (Zeller, 1839)
Mompha sexstrigella (Braun, 1921)
Mompha terminella (Humphreys & Westwood, 1845)

Nepticulidae
Bohemannia pulverosella (Stainton, 1849)
Bohemannia quadrimaculella (Boheman, 1853)
Ectoedemia agrimoniae (Frey, 1858)
Ectoedemia albifasciella (Heinemann, 1871)
Ectoedemia angulifasciella (Stainton, 1849)
Ectoedemia arcuatella (Herrich-Schäffer, 1855)
Ectoedemia argyropeza (Zeller, 1839)
Ectoedemia atricollis (Stainton, 1857)
Ectoedemia hannoverella (Glitz, 1872)
Ectoedemia intimella (Zeller, 1848)
Ectoedemia minimella (Zetterstedt, 1839)
Ectoedemia occultella (Linnaeus, 1767)
Ectoedemia rubivora (Wocke, 1860)
Ectoedemia subbimaculella (Haworth, 1828)
Ectoedemia turbidella (Zeller, 1848)
Ectoedemia albibimaculella (Larsen, 1927)
Ectoedemia decentella (Herrich-Schäffer, 1855)
Ectoedemia sericopeza (Zeller, 1839)
Ectoedemia septembrella (Stainton, 1849)
Ectoedemia weaveri (Stainton, 1855)
Ectoedemia amani Svensson, 1966
Ectoedemia atrifrontella (Stainton, 1851)
Ectoedemia longicaudella Klimesch, 1953
Enteucha acetosae (Stainton, 1854)
Stigmella aceris (Frey, 1857)
Stigmella aeneofasciella (Herrich-Schäffer, 1855)
Stigmella alnetella (Stainton, 1856)
Stigmella anomalella (Goeze, 1783)
Stigmella assimilella (Zeller, 1848)
Stigmella atricapitella (Haworth, 1828)
Stigmella auromarginella (Richardson, 1890)
Stigmella basiguttella (Heinemann, 1862)
Stigmella benanderella (Wolff, 1955)
Stigmella betulicola (Stainton, 1856)
Stigmella carpinella (Heinemann, 1862)
Stigmella catharticella (Stainton, 1853)
Stigmella centifoliella (Zeller, 1848)
Stigmella confusella (Wood & Walsingham, 1894)
Stigmella continuella (Stainton, 1856)
Stigmella crataegella (Klimesch, 1936)
Stigmella dorsiguttella (Johansson, 1971)
Stigmella dryadella (O. Hofmann, 1868)
Stigmella filipendulae (Wocke, 1871)
Stigmella floslactella (Haworth, 1828)
Stigmella glutinosae (Stainton, 1858)
Stigmella hemargyrella (Kollar, 1832)
Stigmella hybnerella (Hübner, 1796)
Stigmella incognitella (Herrich-Schäffer, 1855)
Stigmella lapponica (Wocke, 1862)
Stigmella lediella (Schleich, 1867)
Stigmella lemniscella (Zeller, 1839)
Stigmella lonicerarum (Frey, 1856)
Stigmella luteella (Stainton, 1857)
Stigmella magdalenae (Klimesch, 1950)
Stigmella malella (Stainton, 1854)
Stigmella microtheriella (Stainton, 1854)
Stigmella myrtillella (Stainton, 1857)
Stigmella nylandriella (Tengstrom, 1848)
Stigmella obliquella (Heinemann, 1862)
Stigmella oxyacanthella (Stainton, 1854)
Stigmella paradoxa (Frey, 1858)
Stigmella perpygmaeella (Doubleday, 1859)
Stigmella plagicolella (Stainton, 1854)
Stigmella poterii (Stainton, 1857)
Stigmella pretiosa (Heinemann, 1862)
Stigmella prunetorum (Stainton, 1855)
Stigmella pyri (Glitz, 1865)
Stigmella regiella (Herrich-Schäffer, 1855)
Stigmella roborella (Johansson, 1971)
Stigmella ruficapitella (Haworth, 1828)
Stigmella sakhalinella Puplesis, 1984
Stigmella salicis (Stainton, 1854)
Stigmella samiatella (Zeller, 1839)
Stigmella sorbi (Stainton, 1861)
Stigmella speciosa (Frey, 1858)
Stigmella splendidissimella (Herrich-Schäffer, 1855)
Stigmella svenssoni (Johansson, 1971)
Stigmella tiliae (Frey, 1856)
Stigmella tityrella (Stainton, 1854)
Stigmella trimaculella (Haworth, 1828)
Stigmella tristis (Wocke, 1862)
Stigmella ulmivora (Fologne, 1860)
Stigmella zelleriella (Snellen, 1875)
Trifurcula headleyella (Stainton, 1854)
Trifurcula cryptella (Stainton, 1856)
Trifurcula eurema (Tutt, 1899)
Trifurcula immundella (Zeller, 1839)
Trifurcula subnitidella (Duponchel, 1843)

Noctuidae
Abrostola asclepiadis (Denis & Schiffermüller, 1775)
Abrostola tripartita (Hufnagel, 1766)
Abrostola triplasia (Linnaeus, 1758)
Acontia trabealis (Scopoli, 1763)
Acosmetia caliginosa (Hübner, 1813)
Acronicta aceris (Linnaeus, 1758)
Acronicta leporina (Linnaeus, 1758)
Acronicta strigosa (Denis & Schiffermüller, 1775)
Acronicta alni (Linnaeus, 1767)
Acronicta cuspis (Hübner, 1813)
Acronicta psi (Linnaeus, 1758)
Acronicta tridens (Denis & Schiffermüller, 1775)
Acronicta auricoma (Denis & Schiffermüller, 1775)
Acronicta euphorbiae (Denis & Schiffermüller, 1775)
Acronicta menyanthidis (Esper, 1789)
Acronicta rumicis (Linnaeus, 1758)
Actebia fennica (Tauscher, 1837)
Actebia praecox (Linnaeus, 1758)
Actinotia polyodon (Clerck, 1759)
Agrochola lychnidis (Denis & Schiffermüller, 1775)
Agrochola helvola (Linnaeus, 1758)
Agrochola litura (Linnaeus, 1758)
Agrochola nitida (Denis & Schiffermüller, 1775)
Agrochola lota (Clerck, 1759)
Agrochola macilenta (Hübner, 1809)
Agrochola circellaris (Hufnagel, 1766)
Agrotis cinerea (Denis & Schiffermüller, 1775)
Agrotis clavis (Hufnagel, 1766)
Agrotis exclamationis (Linnaeus, 1758)
Agrotis ipsilon (Hufnagel, 1766)
Agrotis ripae Hübner, 1823
Agrotis segetum (Denis & Schiffermüller, 1775)
Agrotis vestigialis (Hufnagel, 1766)
Allophyes oxyacanthae (Linnaeus, 1758)
Ammoconia caecimacula (Denis & Schiffermüller, 1775)
Amphipoea crinanensis (Burrows, 1908)
Amphipoea fucosa (Freyer, 1830)
Amphipoea lucens (Freyer, 1845)
Amphipoea oculea (Linnaeus, 1761)
Amphipyra berbera Rungs, 1949
Amphipyra perflua (Fabricius, 1787)
Amphipyra pyramidea (Linnaeus, 1758)
Amphipyra tragopoginis (Clerck, 1759)
Anaplectoides prasina (Denis & Schiffermüller, 1775)
Anarta myrtilli (Linnaeus, 1761)
Anarta melanopa (Thunberg, 1791)
Anarta trifolii (Hufnagel, 1766)
Anorthoa munda (Denis & Schiffermüller, 1775)
Antitype chi (Linnaeus, 1758)
Apamea anceps (Denis & Schiffermüller, 1775)
Apamea crenata (Hufnagel, 1766)
Apamea epomidion (Haworth, 1809)
Apamea exulis (Lefebvre, 1836)
Apamea furva (Denis & Schiffermüller, 1775)
Apamea illyria Freyer, 1846
Apamea lateritia (Hufnagel, 1766)
Apamea lithoxylaea (Denis & Schiffermüller, 1775)
Apamea maillardi (Geyer, 1834)
Apamea monoglypha (Hufnagel, 1766)
Apamea oblonga (Haworth, 1809)
Apamea remissa (Hübner, 1809)
Apamea rubrirena (Treitschke, 1825)
Apamea schildei (Staudinger, 1901)
Apamea scolopacina (Esper, 1788)
Apamea sordens (Hufnagel, 1766)
Apamea sublustris (Esper, 1788)
Apamea unanimis (Hübner, 1813)
Aporophyla lueneburgensis (Freyer, 1848)
Apterogenum ypsillon (Denis & Schiffermüller, 1775)
Archanara dissoluta (Treitschke, 1825)
Arenostola phragmitidis (Hübner, 1803)
Asteroscopus sphinx (Hufnagel, 1766)
Athetis gluteosa (Treitschke, 1835)
Athetis pallustris (Hübner, 1808)
Athetis lepigone (Moschler, 1860)
Autographa bractea (Denis & Schiffermüller, 1775)
Autographa buraetica (Staudinger, 1892)
Autographa gamma (Linnaeus, 1758)
Autographa jota (Linnaeus, 1758)
Autographa macrogamma (Eversmann, 1842)
Autographa mandarina (Freyer, 1845)
Autographa pulchrina (Haworth, 1809)
Axylia putris (Linnaeus, 1761)
Blepharita amica (Treitschke, 1825)
Brachionycha nubeculosa (Esper, 1785)
Brachylomia viminalis (Fabricius, 1776)
Bryophila ereptricula Treitschke, 1825
Bryophila raptricula (Denis & Schiffermüller, 1775)
Bryophila domestica (Hufnagel, 1766)
Calamia tridens (Hufnagel, 1766)
Calophasia lunula (Hufnagel, 1766)
Caradrina morpheus (Hufnagel, 1766)
Caradrina clavipalpis Scopoli, 1763
Caradrina selini Boisduval, 1840
Caradrina montana Bremer, 1861
Celaena haworthii (Curtis, 1829)
Ceramica pisi (Linnaeus, 1758)
Cerapteryx graminis (Linnaeus, 1758)
Cerastis leucographa (Denis & Schiffermüller, 1775)
Cerastis rubricosa (Denis & Schiffermüller, 1775)
Charanyca trigrammica (Hufnagel, 1766)
Charanyca ferruginea (Esper, 1785)
Chersotis cuprea (Denis & Schiffermüller, 1775)
Chilodes maritima (Tauscher, 1806)
Chloantha hyperici (Denis & Schiffermüller, 1775)
Chrysodeixis chalcites (Esper, 1789)
Coenobia rufa (Haworth, 1809)
Coenophila subrosea (Stephens, 1829)
Colocasia coryli (Linnaeus, 1758)
Conisania leineri (Freyer, 1836)
Conistra rubiginosa (Scopoli, 1763)
Conistra vaccinii (Linnaeus, 1761)
Conistra erythrocephala (Denis & Schiffermüller, 1775)
Conistra rubiginea (Denis & Schiffermüller, 1775)
Coranarta cordigera (Thunberg, 1788)
Cosmia trapezina (Linnaeus, 1758)
Cosmia diffinis (Linnaeus, 1767)
Cosmia pyralina (Denis & Schiffermüller, 1775)
Cosmia affinis (Linnaeus, 1767)
Craniophora ligustri (Denis & Schiffermüller, 1775)
Cryphia algae (Fabricius, 1775)
Crypsedra gemmea (Treitschke, 1825)
Cucullia absinthii (Linnaeus, 1761)
Cucullia argentea (Hufnagel, 1766)
Cucullia artemisiae (Hufnagel, 1766)
Cucullia asteris (Denis & Schiffermüller, 1775)
Cucullia boryphora Fischer von Waldheim, 1840
Cucullia chamomillae (Denis & Schiffermüller, 1775)
Cucullia fraudatrix Eversmann, 1837
Cucullia gnaphalii (Hübner, 1813)
Cucullia lactucae (Denis & Schiffermüller, 1775)
Cucullia lucifuga (Denis & Schiffermüller, 1775)
Cucullia praecana Eversmann, 1843
Cucullia tanaceti (Denis & Schiffermüller, 1775)
Cucullia umbratica (Linnaeus, 1758)
Cucullia lychnitis Rambur, 1833
Cucullia scrophulariae (Denis & Schiffermüller, 1775)
Cucullia verbasci (Linnaeus, 1758)
Dasypolia templi (Thunberg, 1792)
Deltote bankiana (Fabricius, 1775)
Deltote deceptoria (Scopoli, 1763)
Deltote uncula (Clerck, 1759)
Deltote pygarga (Hufnagel, 1766)
Denticucullus pygmina (Haworth, 1809)
Diachrysia chrysitis (Linnaeus, 1758)
Diachrysia chryson (Esper, 1789)
Diachrysia stenochrysis (Warren, 1913)
Diarsia brunnea (Denis & Schiffermüller, 1775)
Diarsia dahlii (Hübner, 1813)
Diarsia florida (F. Schmidt, 1859)
Diarsia mendica (Fabricius, 1775)
Diarsia rubi (Vieweg, 1790)
Dicycla oo (Linnaeus, 1758)
Diloba caeruleocephala (Linnaeus, 1758)
Dryobotodes eremita (Fabricius, 1775)
Dypterygia scabriuscula (Linnaeus, 1758)
Elaphria venustula (Hübner, 1790)
Enargia paleacea (Esper, 1788)
Epilecta linogrisea (Denis & Schiffermüller, 1775)
Epipsilia grisescens (Fabricius, 1794)
Eremobia ochroleuca (Denis & Schiffermüller, 1775)
Eremohadena immunda (Eversmann, 1842)
Eucarta virgo (Treitschke, 1835)
Eugnorisma glareosa (Esper, 1788)
Eugnorisma depuncta (Linnaeus, 1761)
Eugraphe sigma (Denis & Schiffermüller, 1775)
Euplexia lucipara (Linnaeus, 1758)
Eupsilia transversa (Hufnagel, 1766)
Eurois occulta (Linnaeus, 1758)
Euxoa adumbrata (Eversmann, 1842)
Euxoa cursoria (Hufnagel, 1766)
Euxoa eruta (Hübner, 1817)
Euxoa nigricans (Linnaeus, 1761)
Euxoa nigrofusca (Esper, 1788)
Euxoa obelisca (Denis & Schiffermüller, 1775)
Euxoa ochrogaster (Guenee, 1852)
Euxoa recussa (Hübner, 1817)
Euxoa tritici (Linnaeus, 1761)
Euxoa vitta (Esper, 1789)
Fabula zollikoferi (Freyer, 1836)
Globia algae (Esper, 1789)
Globia sparganii (Esper, 1790)
Gortyna flavago (Denis & Schiffermüller, 1775)
Graphiphora augur (Fabricius, 1775)
Griposia aprilina (Linnaeus, 1758)
Hada plebeja (Linnaeus, 1761)
Hadena irregularis (Hufnagel, 1766)
Hadena perplexa (Denis & Schiffermüller, 1775)
Hadena albimacula (Borkhausen, 1792)
Hadena bicruris (Hufnagel, 1766)
Hadena caesia (Denis & Schiffermüller, 1775)
Hadena capsincola (Denis & Schiffermüller, 1775)
Hadena compta (Denis & Schiffermüller, 1775)
Hadena confusa (Hufnagel, 1766)
Hadena filograna (Esper, 1788)
Hecatera bicolorata (Hufnagel, 1766)
Hecatera dysodea (Denis & Schiffermüller, 1775)
Helicoverpa armigera (Hübner, 1808)
Heliothis maritima Graslin, 1855
Heliothis peltigera (Denis & Schiffermüller, 1775)
Heliothis viriplaca (Hufnagel, 1766)
Helotropha leucostigma (Hübner, 1808)
Hillia iris (Zetterstedt, 1839)
Hoplodrina ambigua (Denis & Schiffermüller, 1775)
Hoplodrina blanda (Denis & Schiffermüller, 1775)
Hoplodrina octogenaria (Goeze, 1781)
Hydraecia micacea (Esper, 1789)
Hydraecia nordstroemi Horke, 1952
Hydraecia petasitis Doubleday, 1847
Hydraecia ultima Holst, 1965
Hyppa rectilinea (Esper, 1788)
Ipimorpha retusa (Linnaeus, 1761)
Ipimorpha subtusa (Denis & Schiffermüller, 1775)
Jodia croceago (Denis & Schiffermüller, 1775)
Lacanobia contigua (Denis & Schiffermüller, 1775)
Lacanobia suasa (Denis & Schiffermüller, 1775)
Lacanobia thalassina (Hufnagel, 1766)
Lacanobia oleracea (Linnaeus, 1758)
Lacanobia w-latinum (Hufnagel, 1766)
Lamprotes c-aureum (Knoch, 1781)
Lasionycta imbecilla (Fabricius, 1794)
Lasionycta leucocycla (Staudinger, 1857)
Lasionycta proxima (Hübner, 1809)
Lasionycta secedens (Walker, 1858)
Lasionycta skraelingia (Herrich-Schäffer, 1852)
Lasionycta staudingeri (Aurivillius, 1891)
Lateroligia ophiogramma (Esper, 1794)
Lenisa geminipuncta (Haworth, 1809)
Leucania comma (Linnaeus, 1761)
Leucania obsoleta (Hübner, 1803)
Lithophane consocia (Borkhausen, 1792)
Lithophane furcifera (Hufnagel, 1766)
Lithophane lamda (Fabricius, 1787)
Lithophane ornitopus (Hufnagel, 1766)
Lithophane semibrunnea (Haworth, 1809)
Lithophane socia (Hufnagel, 1766)
Litoligia literosa (Haworth, 1809)
Longalatedes elymi (Treitschke, 1825)
Luperina testacea (Denis & Schiffermüller, 1775)
Lycophotia porphyrea (Denis & Schiffermüller, 1775)
Macdunnoughia confusa (Stephens, 1850)
Mamestra brassicae (Linnaeus, 1758)
Melanchra persicariae (Linnaeus, 1761)
Mesapamea secalella Remm, 1983
Mesapamea secalis (Linnaeus, 1758)
Mesogona oxalina (Hübner, 1803)
Mesoligia furuncula (Denis & Schiffermüller, 1775)
Mniotype adusta (Esper, 1790)
Mniotype bathensis (Lutzau, 1901)
Mniotype satura (Denis & Schiffermüller, 1775)
Moma alpium (Osbeck, 1778)
Mythimna albipuncta (Denis & Schiffermüller, 1775)
Mythimna ferrago (Fabricius, 1787)
Mythimna l-album (Linnaeus, 1767)
Mythimna litoralis (Curtis, 1827)
Mythimna conigera (Denis & Schiffermüller, 1775)
Mythimna impura (Hübner, 1808)
Mythimna pallens (Linnaeus, 1758)
Mythimna pudorina (Denis & Schiffermüller, 1775)
Mythimna straminea (Treitschke, 1825)
Mythimna turca (Linnaeus, 1761)
Mythimna vitellina (Hübner, 1808)
Mythimna unipuncta (Haworth, 1809)
Naenia typica (Linnaeus, 1758)
Noctua comes Hübner, 1813
Noctua fimbriata (Schreber, 1759)
Noctua interjecta Hübner, 1803
Noctua interposita (Hübner, 1790)
Noctua janthe (Borkhausen, 1792)
Noctua janthina Denis & Schiffermüller, 1775
Noctua orbona (Hufnagel, 1766)
Noctua pronuba (Linnaeus, 1758)
Nonagria typhae (Thunberg, 1784)
Nyctobrya muralis (Forster, 1771)
Ochropleura plecta (Linnaeus, 1761)
Oligia fasciuncula (Haworth, 1809)
Oligia latruncula (Denis & Schiffermüller, 1775)
Oligia strigilis (Linnaeus, 1758)
Oligia versicolor (Borkhausen, 1792)
Opigena polygona (Denis & Schiffermüller, 1775)
Orthosia gracilis (Denis & Schiffermüller, 1775)
Orthosia opima (Hübner, 1809)
Orthosia cerasi (Fabricius, 1775)
Orthosia cruda (Denis & Schiffermüller, 1775)
Orthosia miniosa (Denis & Schiffermüller, 1775)
Orthosia populeti (Fabricius, 1775)
Orthosia incerta (Hufnagel, 1766)
Orthosia gothica (Linnaeus, 1758)
Pabulatrix pabulatricula (Brahm, 1791)
Pachetra sagittigera (Hufnagel, 1766)
Panemeria tenebrata (Scopoli, 1763)
Panolis flammea (Denis & Schiffermüller, 1775)
Panthea coenobita (Esper, 1785)
Papestra biren (Goeze, 1781)
Parastichtis suspecta (Hübner, 1817)
Peridroma saucia (Hübner, 1808)
Phlogophora meticulosa (Linnaeus, 1758)
Photedes captiuncula (Treitschke, 1825)
Photedes extrema (Hübner, 1809)
Photedes fluxa (Hübner, 1809)
Photedes minima (Haworth, 1809)
Photedes morrisii (Dale, 1837)
Phragmatiphila nexa (Hübner, 1808)
Plusia festucae (Linnaeus, 1758)
Plusia putnami (Grote, 1873)
Polia bombycina (Hufnagel, 1766)
Polia hepatica (Clerck, 1759)
Polia lamuta (Herz, 1903)
Polia nebulosa (Hufnagel, 1766)
Polia richardsoni (Curtis, 1835)
Polychrysia moneta (Fabricius, 1787)
Polymixis flavicincta (Denis & Schiffermüller, 1775)
Polymixis polymita (Linnaeus, 1761)
Protarchanara brevilinea (Fenn, 1864)
Protolampra sobrina (Duponchel, 1843)
Protoschinia scutosa (Denis & Schiffermüller, 1775)
Pseudeustrotia candidula (Denis & Schiffermüller, 1775)
Pyrrhia umbra (Hufnagel, 1766)
Rhizedra lutosa (Hübner, 1803)
Rhyacia simulans (Hufnagel, 1766)
Sedina buettneri (E. Hering, 1858)
Senta flammea (Curtis, 1828)
Sideridis rivularis (Fabricius, 1775)
Sideridis reticulata (Goeze, 1781)
Sideridis turbida (Esper, 1790)
Simyra albovenosa (Goeze, 1781)
Spaelotis ravida (Denis & Schiffermüller, 1775)
Spaelotis suecica (Aurivillius, 1890)
Spodoptera exigua (Hübner, 1808)
Standfussiana lucernea (Linnaeus, 1758)
Staurophora celsia (Linnaeus, 1758)
Subacronicta megacephala (Denis & Schiffermüller, 1775)
Sympistis funebris (Hübner, 1809)
Sympistis heliophila (Paykull, 1793)
Sympistis lapponica (Thunberg, 1791)
Sympistis nigrita (Boisduval, 1840)
Syngrapha diasema (Boisduval, 1829)
Syngrapha hochenwarthi (Hochenwarth, 1785)
Syngrapha interrogationis (Linnaeus, 1758)
Syngrapha microgamma (Hübner, 1823)
Syngrapha parilis (Hübner, 1809)
Thalpophila matura (Hufnagel, 1766)
Tholera cespitis (Denis & Schiffermüller, 1775)
Tholera decimalis (Poda, 1761)
Tiliacea aurago (Denis & Schiffermüller, 1775)
Tiliacea citrago (Linnaeus, 1758)
Tiliacea sulphurago (Denis & Schiffermüller, 1775)
Trachea atriplicis (Linnaeus, 1758)
Trichoplusia ni (Hübner, 1803)
Trichosea ludifica (Linnaeus, 1758)
Tyta luctuosa (Denis & Schiffermüller, 1775)
Victrix umovii (Eversmann, 1846)
Xanthia gilvago (Denis & Schiffermüller, 1775)
Xanthia icteritia (Hufnagel, 1766)
Xanthia ocellaris (Borkhausen, 1792)
Xanthia togata (Esper, 1788)
Xestia ashworthii (Doubleday, 1855)
Xestia c-nigrum (Linnaeus, 1758)
Xestia ditrapezium (Denis & Schiffermüller, 1775)
Xestia triangulum (Hufnagel, 1766)
Xestia alpicola (Zetterstedt, 1839)
Xestia atrata (Morrison, 1874)
Xestia borealis (Nordstrom, 1933)
Xestia distensa (Eversmann, 1851)
Xestia fennica (Brandt, 1936)
Xestia gelida (Sparre-Schneider, 1883)
Xestia laetabilis (Zetterstedt, 1839)
Xestia lorezi (Staudinger, 1891)
Xestia sincera (Herrich-Schäffer, 1851)
Xestia speciosa (Hübner, 1813)
Xestia tecta (Hübner, 1808)
Xestia lyngei (Rebel, 1923)
Xestia quieta (Hübner, 1813)
Xestia baja (Denis & Schiffermüller, 1775)
Xestia castanea (Esper, 1798)
Xestia collina (Boisduval, 1840)
Xestia sexstrigata (Haworth, 1809)
Xestia stigmatica (Hübner, 1813)
Xestia xanthographa (Denis & Schiffermüller, 1775)
Xylena solidaginis (Hübner, 1803)
Xylena exsoleta (Linnaeus, 1758)
Xylena vetusta (Hübner, 1813)
Xylocampa areola (Esper, 1789)

Nolidae
Bena bicolorana (Fuessly, 1775)
Earias clorana (Linnaeus, 1761)
Earias vernana (Fabricius, 1787)
Meganola albula (Denis & Schiffermüller, 1775)
Nola aerugula (Hübner, 1793)
Nola confusalis (Herrich-Schäffer, 1847)
Nola cucullatella (Linnaeus, 1758)
Nola karelica Tengstrom, 1869
Nycteola asiatica (Krulikovsky, 1904)
Nycteola degenerana (Hübner, 1799)
Nycteola revayana (Scopoli, 1772)
Nycteola svecicus (Bryk, 1941)
Pseudoips prasinana (Linnaeus, 1758)

Notodontidae
Cerura vinula (Linnaeus, 1758)
Clostera anachoreta (Denis & Schiffermüller, 1775)
Clostera anastomosis (Linnaeus, 1758)
Clostera curtula (Linnaeus, 1758)
Clostera pigra (Hufnagel, 1766)
Drymonia dodonaea (Denis & Schiffermüller, 1775)
Drymonia ruficornis (Hufnagel, 1766)
Furcula bicuspis (Borkhausen, 1790)
Furcula bifida (Brahm, 1787)
Furcula furcula (Clerck, 1759)
Gluphisia crenata (Esper, 1785)
Harpyia milhauseri (Fabricius, 1775)
Leucodonta bicoloria (Denis & Schiffermüller, 1775)
Notodonta dromedarius (Linnaeus, 1767)
Notodonta torva (Hübner, 1803)
Notodonta tritophus (Denis & Schiffermüller, 1775)
Notodonta ziczac (Linnaeus, 1758)
Odontosia carmelita (Esper, 1799)
Odontosia sieversii (Menetries, 1856)
Peridea anceps (Goeze, 1781)
Phalera bucephala (Linnaeus, 1758)
Pheosia gnoma (Fabricius, 1776)
Pheosia tremula (Clerck, 1759)
Pterostoma palpina (Clerck, 1759)
Ptilodon capucina (Linnaeus, 1758)
Ptilophora plumigera (Denis & Schiffermüller, 1775)
Pygaera timon (Hübner, 1803)
Stauropus fagi (Linnaeus, 1758)
Thaumetopoea pinivora (Treitschke, 1834)

Oecophoridae
Aplota palpella (Haworth, 1828)
Batia internella Jackh, 1972
Bisigna procerella (Denis & Schiffermüller, 1775)
Borkhausenia fuscescens (Haworth, 1828)
Borkhausenia luridicomella (Herrich-Schäffer, 1856)
Borkhausenia minutella (Linnaeus, 1758)
Crassa tinctella (Hübner, 1796)
Crassa unitella (Hübner, 1796)
Decantha borkhausenii (Zeller, 1839)
Denisia albimaculea (Haworth, 1828)
Denisia obscurella (Brandt, 1937)
Denisia similella (Hübner, 1796)
Denisia stipella (Linnaeus, 1758)
Denisia stroemella (Fabricius, 1779)
Endrosis sarcitrella (Linnaeus, 1758)
Epicallima formosella (Denis & Schiffermüller, 1775)
Eratophyes amasiella (Herrich-Schäffer, 1854)
Harpella forficella (Scopoli, 1763)
Hofmannophila pseudospretella (Stainton, 1849)
Metalampra cinnamomea (Zeller, 1839)
Oecophora bractella (Linnaeus, 1758)
Pleurota bicostella (Clerck, 1759)
Schiffermuelleria schaefferella (Linnaeus, 1758)

Opostegidae
Opostega salaciella (Treitschke, 1833)
Pseudopostega auritella (Hübner, 1813)
Pseudopostega crepusculella (Zeller, 1839)

Peleopodidae
Carcina quercana (Fabricius, 1775)

Plutellidae
Eidophasia messingiella (Fischer von Röslerstamm, 1840)
Plutella xylostella (Linnaeus, 1758)
Plutella haasi Staudinger, 1883
Plutella hyperboreella Strand, 1902
Plutella porrectella (Linnaeus, 1758)
Rhigognostis annulatella (Curtis, 1832)
Rhigognostis incarnatella (Steudel, 1873)
Rhigognostis kuusamoensis Kyrki, 1989
Rhigognostis schmaltzella (Zetterstedt, 1839)
Rhigognostis senilella (Zetterstedt, 1839)

Praydidae
Atemelia torquatella (Lienig & Zeller, 1846)
Prays fraxinella (Bjerkander, 1784)
Prays ruficeps (Heinemann, 1854)

Prodoxidae
Lampronia aeripennella (Rebel, 1889)
Lampronia capitella (Clerck, 1759)
Lampronia corticella (Linnaeus, 1758)
Lampronia flavimitrella (Hübner, 1817)
Lampronia fuscatella (Tengstrom, 1848)
Lampronia luzella (Hübner, 1817)
Lampronia morosa Zeller, 1852
Lampronia redimitella (Lienig & Zeller, 1846)
Lampronia rupella (Denis & Schiffermüller, 1775)
Lampronia standfussiella Zeller, 1852

Psychidae
Acanthopsyche atra (Linnaeus, 1767)
Anaproutia norvegica (Schoyen, 1880)
Apterona helicoidella (Vallot, 1827)
Bacotia claustrella (Bruand, 1845)
Canephora hirsuta (Poda, 1761)
Dahlica charlottae (Meier, 1957)
Dahlica lazuri (Clerck, 1759)
Dahlica lichenella (Linnaeus, 1761)
Dahlica triquetrella (Hübner, 1813)
Diplodoma laichartingella Goeze, 1783
Narycia duplicella (Goeze, 1783)
Pachythelia villosella (Ochsenheimer, 1810)
Phalacropterix graslinella (Boisduval, 1852)
Proutia rotunda Suomalainen, 1990
Psyche casta (Pallas, 1767)
Psyche crassiorella Bruand, 1851
Siederia listerella (Linnaeus, 1758)
Siederia rupicolella (Sauter, 1954)
Sterrhopterix fusca (Haworth, 1809)
Sterrhopterix standfussi (Wocke, 1851)
Taleporia borealis Wocke, 1862
Taleporia tubulosa (Retzius, 1783)
Whittleia retiella (Newman, 1847)

Pterophoridae
Adaina microdactyla (Hübner, 1813)
Amblyptilia acanthadactyla (Hübner, 1813)
Amblyptilia punctidactyla (Haworth, 1811)
Buckleria paludum (Zeller, 1839)
Buszkoiana capnodactylus (Zeller, 1841)
Calyciphora albodactylus (Fabricius, 1794)
Cnaemidophorus rhododactyla (Denis & Schiffermüller, 1775)
Crombrugghia distans (Zeller, 1847)
Emmelina monodactyla (Linnaeus, 1758)
Geina didactyla (Linnaeus, 1758)
Gillmeria ochrodactyla (Denis & Schiffermüller, 1775)
Gillmeria pallidactyla (Haworth, 1811)
Hellinsia didactylites (Strom, 1783)
Hellinsia distinctus (Herrich-Schäffer, 1855)
Hellinsia lienigianus (Zeller, 1852)
Hellinsia osteodactylus (Zeller, 1841)
Hellinsia tephradactyla (Hübner, 1813)
Marasmarcha lunaedactyla (Haworth, 1811)
Merrifieldia baliodactylus (Zeller, 1841)
Merrifieldia leucodactyla (Denis & Schiffermüller, 1775)
Merrifieldia tridactyla (Linnaeus, 1758)
Oidaematophorus lithodactyla (Treitschke, 1833)
Oidaematophorus rogenhoferi (Mann, 1871)
Oidaematophorus vafradactylus Svensson, 1966
Oxyptilus chrysodactyla (Denis & Schiffermüller, 1775)
Oxyptilus ericetorum (Stainton, 1851)
Oxyptilus parvidactyla (Haworth, 1811)
Oxyptilus pilosellae (Zeller, 1841)
Platyptilia calodactyla (Denis & Schiffermüller, 1775)
Platyptilia gonodactyla (Denis & Schiffermüller, 1775)
Platyptilia tesseradactyla (Linnaeus, 1761)
Porrittia galactodactyla (Denis & Schiffermüller, 1775)
Pselnophorus heterodactyla (Muller, 1764)
Pterophorus pentadactyla (Linnaeus, 1758)
Stenoptilia bipunctidactyla (Scopoli, 1763)
Stenoptilia islandicus (Staudinger, 1857)
Stenoptilia pelidnodactyla (Stein, 1837)
Stenoptilia pneumonanthes (Buttner, 1880)
Stenoptilia pterodactyla (Linnaeus, 1761)
Stenoptilia veronicae Karvonen, 1932
Stenoptilia zophodactylus (Duponchel, 1840)

Pyralidae
Achroia grisella (Fabricius, 1794)
Acrobasis advenella (Zincken, 1818)
Acrobasis consociella (Hübner, 1813)
Acrobasis marmorea (Haworth, 1811)
Acrobasis repandana (Fabricius, 1798)
Acrobasis sodalella Zeller, 1848
Acrobasis suavella (Zincken, 1818)
Acrobasis tumidana (Denis & Schiffermüller, 1775)
Aglossa pinguinalis (Linnaeus, 1758)
Ancylosis cinnamomella (Duponchel, 1836)
Ancylosis oblitella (Zeller, 1848)
Anerastia lotella (Hübner, 1813)
Aphomia sociella (Linnaeus, 1758)
Aphomia zelleri de Joannis, 1932
Apomyelois bistriatella (Hulst, 1887)
Assara terebrella (Zincken, 1818)
Cadra calidella (Guenee, 1845)
Cadra cautella (Walker, 1863)
Cadra figulilella (Gregson, 1871)
Catastia kistrandella Opheim, 1963
Catastia marginea (Denis & Schiffermüller, 1775)
Corcyra cephalonica (Stainton, 1866)
Cryptoblabes bistriga (Haworth, 1811)
Delplanqueia dilutella (Denis & Schiffermüller, 1775)
Dioryctria abietella (Denis & Schiffermüller, 1775)
Dioryctria schuetzeella Fuchs, 1899
Dioryctria simplicella Heinemann, 1863
Dioryctria sylvestrella (Ratzeburg, 1840)
Elegia similella (Zincken, 1818)
Endotricha flammealis (Denis & Schiffermüller, 1775)
Ephestia elutella (Hübner, 1796)
Ephestia kuehniella Zeller, 1879
Ephestia mistralella (Milliere, 1874)
Episcythrastis tetricella (Denis & Schiffermüller, 1775)
Eurhodope cirrigerella (Zincken, 1818)
Eurhodope rosella (Scopoli, 1763)
Euzophera cinerosella (Zeller, 1839)
Euzophera fuliginosella (Heinemann, 1865)
Euzophera pinguis (Haworth, 1811)
Galleria mellonella (Linnaeus, 1758)
Homoeosoma nebulella (Denis & Schiffermüller, 1775)
Homoeosoma nimbella (Duponchel, 1837)
Homoeosoma sinuella (Fabricius, 1794)
Hypochalcia ahenella (Denis & Schiffermüller, 1775)
Hypsopygia costalis (Fabricius, 1775)
Hypsopygia glaucinalis (Linnaeus, 1758)
Khorassania compositella (Treitschke, 1835)
Laodamia faecella (Zeller, 1839)
Matilella fusca (Haworth, 1811)
Myelois circumvoluta (Fourcroy, 1785)
Nephopterix angustella (Hübner, 1796)
Nyctegretis lineana (Scopoli, 1786)
Oncocera semirubella (Scopoli, 1763)
Ortholepis betulae (Goeze, 1778)
Ortholepis vacciniella (Lienig & Zeller, 1847)
Paralipsa gularis (Zeller, 1877)
Pempelia palumbella (Denis & Schiffermüller, 1775)
Pempeliella ornatella (Denis & Schiffermüller, 1775)
Phycita roborella (Denis & Schiffermüller, 1775)
Phycitodes albatella (Ragonot, 1887)
Phycitodes binaevella (Hübner, 1813)
Phycitodes lacteella (Rothschild, 1915)
Phycitodes maritima (Tengstrom, 1848)
Phycitodes saxicola (Vaughan, 1870)
Pima boisduvaliella (Guenee, 1845)
Plodia interpunctella (Hübner, 1813)
Polopeustis altensis (Wocke, 1862)
Pyralis farinalis (Linnaeus, 1758)
Pyralis lienigialis (Zeller, 1843)
Pyralis regalis Denis & Schiffermüller, 1775
Rhodophaea formosa (Haworth, 1811)
Salebriopsis albicilla (Herrich-Schäffer, 1849)
Sciota adelphella (Fischer v. Röslerstamm, 1836)
Sciota hostilis (Stephens, 1834)
Selagia argyrella (Denis & Schiffermüller, 1775)
Selagia spadicella (Hübner, 1796)
Synaphe punctalis (Fabricius, 1775)
Vitula biviella (Zeller, 1848)
Vitula edmandsii (Packard, 1865)
Zophodia grossulariella (Hübner, 1809)

Roeslerstammiidae
Roeslerstammia erxlebella (Fabricius, 1787)

Saturniidae
Aglia tau (Linnaeus, 1758)
Saturnia pavonia (Linnaeus, 1758)

Schreckensteiniidae
Schreckensteinia festaliella (Hübner, 1819)

Scythrididae
Scythris cicadella (Zeller, 1839)
Scythris crypta Hannemann, 1961
Scythris disparella (Tengstrom, 1848)
Scythris empetrella Karsholt & Nielsen, 1976
Scythris fuscoaenea (Haworth, 1828)
Scythris fuscopterella Bengtsson, 1977
Scythris inspersella (Hübner, 1817)
Scythris knochella (Fabricius, 1794)
Scythris laminella (Denis & Schiffermüller, 1775)
Scythris limbella (Fabricius, 1775)
Scythris noricella (Zeller, 1843)
Scythris picaepennis (Haworth, 1828)
Scythris potentillella (Zeller, 1847)
Scythris productella (Zeller, 1839)
Scythris siccella (Zeller, 1839)

Sesiidae
Bembecia ichneumoniformis (Denis & Schiffermüller, 1775)
Paranthrene tabaniformis (Rottemburg, 1775)
Pennisetia hylaeiformis (Laspeyres, 1801)
Pyropteron muscaeformis (Esper, 1783)
Sesia apiformis (Clerck, 1759)
Sesia bembeciformis (Hübner, 1806)
Sesia melanocephala Dalman, 1816
Synanthedon andrenaeformis (Laspeyres, 1801)
Synanthedon culiciformis (Linnaeus, 1758)
Synanthedon flaviventris (Staudinger, 1883)
Synanthedon formicaeformis (Esper, 1783)
Synanthedon myopaeformis (Borkhausen, 1789)
Synanthedon polaris (Staudinger, 1877)
Synanthedon scoliaeformis (Borkhausen, 1789)
Synanthedon spheciformis (Denis & Schiffermüller, 1775)
Synanthedon tipuliformis (Clerck, 1759)
Synanthedon vespiformis (Linnaeus, 1761)

Sphingidae
Acherontia atropos (Linnaeus, 1758)
Agrius convolvuli (Linnaeus, 1758)
Daphnis nerii (Linnaeus, 1758)
Deilephila elpenor (Linnaeus, 1758)
Deilephila porcellus (Linnaeus, 1758)
Hemaris fuciformis (Linnaeus, 1758)
Hemaris tityus (Linnaeus, 1758)
Hyles euphorbiae (Linnaeus, 1758)
Hyles gallii (Rottemburg, 1775)
Hyles livornica (Esper, 1780)
Laothoe populi (Linnaeus, 1758)
Macroglossum stellatarum (Linnaeus, 1758)
Mimas tiliae (Linnaeus, 1758)
Smerinthus ocellata (Linnaeus, 1758)
Sphinx ligustri Linnaeus, 1758
Sphinx pinastri Linnaeus, 1758

Stathmopodidae
Stathmopoda pedella (Linnaeus, 1761)

Tineidae
Agnathosia mendicella (Denis & Schiffermüller, 1775)
Agnathosia sandoeensis Jonasson, 1977
Archinemapogon yildizae Kocak, 1981
Elatobia fuliginosella (Lienig & Zeller, 1846)
Haplotinea ditella (Pierce & Metcalfe, 1938)
Haplotinea insectella (Fabricius, 1794)
Infurcitinea albicomella (Stainton, 1851)
Infurcitinea argentimaculella (Stainton, 1849)
Infurcitinea ignicomella (Zeller, 1852)
Karsholtia marianii (Rebel, 1936)
Monopis fenestratella (Heyden, 1863)
Monopis imella (Hübner, 1813)
Monopis laevigella (Denis & Schiffermüller, 1775)
Monopis monachella (Hübner, 1796)
Monopis obviella (Denis & Schiffermüller, 1775)
Monopis spilotella (Tengstrom, 1848)
Monopis weaverella (Scott, 1858)
Montescardia tessulatellus (Zeller, 1846)
Morophaga choragella (Denis & Schiffermüller, 1775)
Myrmecozela ochraceella (Tengstrom, 1848)
Nemapogon clematella (Fabricius, 1781)
Nemapogon cloacella (Haworth, 1828)
Nemapogon falstriella (Bang-Haas, 1881)
Nemapogon fungivorella (Benander, 1939)
Nemapogon granella (Linnaeus, 1758)
Nemapogon inconditella (Lucas, 1956)
Nemapogon nigralbella (Zeller, 1839)
Nemapogon picarella (Clerck, 1759)
Nemapogon variatella (Clemens, 1859)
Nemapogon wolffiella Karsholt & Nielsen, 1976
Nemaxera betulinella (Fabricius, 1787)
Niditinea fuscella (Linnaeus, 1758)
Niditinea striolella (Matsumura, 1931)
Niditinea truncicolella (Tengstrom, 1848)
Pelecystola fraudulentella (Zeller, 1852)
Scardia boletella (Fabricius, 1794)
Stenoptinea cyaneimarmorella (Milliere, 1854)
Tinea bothniella Svensson, 1953
Tinea columbariella Wocke, 1877
Tinea dubiella Stainton, 1859
Tinea pallescentella Stainton, 1851
Tinea pellionella Linnaeus, 1758
Tinea semifulvella Haworth, 1828
Tinea steueri Petersen, 1966
Tinea svenssoni Opheim, 1965
Tinea trinotella Thunberg, 1794
Tineola bisselliella (Hummel, 1823)
Triaxomasia caprimulgella (Stainton, 1851)
Triaxomera fulvimitrella (Sodoffsky, 1830)
Triaxomera parasitella (Hübner, 1796)
Trichophaga scandinaviella Zagulajev, 1960
Trichophaga tapetzella (Linnaeus, 1758)

Tischeriidae
Coptotriche angusticollella (Duponchel, 1843)
Coptotriche gaunacella (Duponchel, 1843)
Coptotriche heinemanni (Wocke, 1871)
Coptotriche marginea (Haworth, 1828)
Tischeria dodonaea Stainton, 1858
Tischeria ekebladella (Bjerkander, 1795)

Tortricidae
Acleris arcticana (Guenee, 1845)
Acleris aspersana (Hübner, 1817)
Acleris bergmanniana (Linnaeus, 1758)
Acleris comariana (Lienig & Zeller, 1846)
Acleris cristana (Denis & Schiffermüller, 1775)
Acleris effractana (Hübner, 1799)
Acleris emargana (Fabricius, 1775)
Acleris ferrugana (Denis & Schiffermüller, 1775)
Acleris fimbriana (Thunberg, 1791)
Acleris forsskaleana (Linnaeus, 1758)
Acleris hastiana (Linnaeus, 1758)
Acleris holmiana (Linnaeus, 1758)
Acleris hyemana (Haworth, 1811)
Acleris implexana (Walker, 1863)
Acleris kochiella (Goeze, 1783)
Acleris laterana (Fabricius, 1794)
Acleris lipsiana (Denis & Schiffermüller, 1775)
Acleris literana (Linnaeus, 1758)
Acleris logiana (Clerck, 1759)
Acleris lorquiniana (Duponchel, 1835)
Acleris maccana (Treitschke, 1835)
Acleris nigrilineana Kawabe, 1963
Acleris notana (Donovan, 1806)
Acleris obtusana (Eversmann, 1844)
Acleris permutana (Duponchel, 1836)
Acleris quercinana (Zeller, 1849)
Acleris rhombana (Denis & Schiffermüller, 1775)
Acleris roscidana (Hübner, 1799)
Acleris rufana (Denis & Schiffermüller, 1775)
Acleris schalleriana (Linnaeus, 1761)
Acleris shepherdana (Stephens, 1852)
Acleris sparsana (Denis & Schiffermüller, 1775)
Acleris umbrana (Hübner, 1799)
Acleris variegana (Denis & Schiffermüller, 1775)
Adoxophyes orana (Fischer v. Röslerstamm, 1834)
Aethes beatricella (Walsingham, 1898)
Aethes cnicana (Westwood, 1854)
Aethes deutschiana (Zetterstedt, 1839)
Aethes dilucidana (Stephens, 1852)
Aethes fennicana (M. Hering, 1924)
Aethes francillana (Fabricius, 1794)
Aethes hartmanniana (Clerck, 1759)
Aethes kindermanniana (Treitschke, 1830)
Aethes margaritana (Haworth, 1811)
Aethes rubigana (Treitschke, 1830)
Aethes rutilana (Hübner, 1817)
Aethes smeathmanniana (Fabricius, 1781)
Aethes tesserana (Denis & Schiffermüller, 1775)
Aethes triangulana (Treitschke, 1835)
Agapeta hamana (Linnaeus, 1758)
Agapeta zoegana (Linnaeus, 1767)
Aleimma loeflingiana (Linnaeus, 1758)
Ancylis achatana (Denis & Schiffermüller, 1775)
Ancylis apicella (Denis & Schiffermüller, 1775)
Ancylis badiana (Denis & Schiffermüller, 1775)
Ancylis comptana (Frolich, 1828)
Ancylis diminutana (Haworth, 1811)
Ancylis geminana (Donovan, 1806)
Ancylis kenneli Kuznetsov, 1962
Ancylis laetana (Fabricius, 1775)
Ancylis mitterbacheriana (Denis & Schiffermüller, 1775)
Ancylis myrtillana (Treitschke, 1830)
Ancylis obtusana (Haworth, 1811)
Ancylis paludana Barrett, 1871
Ancylis selenana (Guenee, 1845)
Ancylis subarcuana (Douglas, 1847)
Ancylis tineana (Hübner, 1799)
Ancylis uncella (Denis & Schiffermüller, 1775)
Ancylis unculana (Haworth, 1811)
Ancylis unguicella (Linnaeus, 1758)
Ancylis upupana (Treitschke, 1835)
Aphelia viburniana (Denis & Schiffermüller, 1775)
Aphelia paleana (Hübner, 1793)
Aphelia unitana (Hübner, 1799)
Apotomis algidana Krogerus, 1946
Apotomis betuletana (Haworth, 1811)
Apotomis boreana Krogerus, 1946
Apotomis capreana (Hübner, 1817)
Apotomis demissana (Kennel, 1901)
Apotomis fraterculana Krogerus, 1946
Apotomis infida (Heinrich, 1926)
Apotomis inundana (Denis & Schiffermüller, 1775)
Apotomis lemniscatana (Kennel, 1901)
Apotomis lineana (Denis & Schiffermüller, 1775)
Apotomis moestana (Wocke, 1862)
Apotomis sauciana (Frolich, 1828)
Apotomis semifasciana (Haworth, 1811)
Apotomis sororculana (Zetterstedt, 1839)
Apotomis turbidana Hübner, 1825
Archips betulana (Hübner, 1787)
Archips crataegana (Hübner, 1799)
Archips oporana (Linnaeus, 1758)
Archips podana (Scopoli, 1763)
Archips rosana (Linnaeus, 1758)
Archips xylosteana (Linnaeus, 1758)
Argyroploce aquilonana Karvonen, 1932
Argyroploce arbutella (Linnaeus, 1758)
Argyroploce concretana (Wocke, 1862)
Argyroploce externa (Eversmann, 1844)
Argyroploce lediana (Linnaeus, 1758)
Argyroploce noricana (Herrich-Schäffer, 1851)
Argyroploce roseomaculana (Herrich-Schäffer, 1851)
Argyrotaenia ljungiana (Thunberg, 1797)
Aterpia sieversiana (Nolcken, 1870)
Bactra furfurana (Haworth, 1811)
Bactra lacteana Caradja, 1916
Bactra lancealana (Hübner, 1799)
Bactra robustana (Christoph, 1872)
Bactra suedana Bengtsson, 1989
Capricornia boisduvaliana (Duponchel, 1836)
Capua vulgana (Frolich, 1828)
Celypha aurofasciana (Haworth, 1811)
Celypha cespitana (Hübner, 1817)
Celypha lacunana (Denis & Schiffermüller, 1775)
Celypha rivulana (Scopoli, 1763)
Celypha rosaceana Schlager, 1847
Celypha rufana (Scopoli, 1763)
Celypha rurestrana (Duponchel, 1843)
Celypha siderana (Treitschke, 1835)
Celypha striana (Denis & Schiffermüller, 1775)
Celypha tiedemanniana (Zeller, 1845)
Choristoneura albaniana (Walker, 1863)
Choristoneura diversana (Hübner, 1817)
Choristoneura hebenstreitella (Muller, 1764)
Clepsis consimilana (Hübner, 1817)
Clepsis illustrana (Krogerus, 1936)
Clepsis neglectana (Herrich-Schäffer, 1851)
Clepsis nybomi Hackman, 1950
Clepsis pallidana (Fabricius, 1776)
Clepsis rurinana (Linnaeus, 1758)
Clepsis senecionana (Hübner, 1819)
Clepsis spectrana (Treitschke, 1830)
Cnephasia asseclana (Denis & Schiffermüller, 1775)
Cnephasia communana (Herrich-Schäffer, 1851)
Cnephasia genitalana Pierce & Metcalfe, 1922
Cnephasia longana (Haworth, 1811)
Cnephasia pasiuana (Hübner, 1799)
Cnephasia stephensiana (Doubleday, 1849)
Cnephasia incertana (Treitschke, 1835)
Cochylidia heydeniana (Herrich-Schäffer, 1851)
Cochylidia implicitana (Wocke, 1856)
Cochylidia moguntiana (Rossler, 1864)
Cochylidia richteriana (Fischer v. Röslerstamm, 1837)
Cochylidia rupicola (Curtis, 1834)
Cochylidia subroseana (Haworth, 1811)
Cochylimorpha alternana (Stephens, 1834)
Cochylimorpha hilarana (Herrich-Schäffer, 1851)
Cochylimorpha straminea (Haworth, 1811)
Cochylimorpha woliniana (Schleich, 1868)
Cochylis atricapitana (Stephens, 1852)
Cochylis dubitana (Hübner, 1799)
Cochylis epilinana Duponchel, 1842
Cochylis flaviciliana (Westwood, 1854)
Cochylis hybridella (Hübner, 1813)
Cochylis nana (Haworth, 1811)
Cochylis pallidana Zeller, 1847
Cochylis posterana Zeller, 1847
Corticivora piniana (Herrich-Schäffer, 1851)
Cydia amplana (Hübner, 1800)
Cydia cognatana (Barrett, 1874)
Cydia coniferana (Saxesen, 1840)
Cydia cornucopiae (Tengstrom, 1869)
Cydia corollana (Hübner, 1823)
Cydia cosmophorana (Treitschke, 1835)
Cydia duplicana (Zetterstedt, 1839)
Cydia fagiglandana (Zeller, 1841)
Cydia grunertiana (Ratzeburg, 1868)
Cydia illutana (Herrich-Schäffer, 1851)
Cydia indivisa (Danilevsky, 1963)
Cydia inquinatana (Hübner, 1800)
Cydia leguminana (Lienig & Zeller, 1846)
Cydia medicaginis (Kuznetsov, 1962)
Cydia microgrammana (Guenee, 1845)
Cydia nigricana (Fabricius, 1794)
Cydia pactolana (Zeller, 1840)
Cydia pomonella (Linnaeus, 1758)
Cydia servillana (Duponchel, 1836)
Cydia splendana (Hübner, 1799)
Cydia strobilella (Linnaeus, 1758)
Cydia succedana (Denis & Schiffermüller, 1775)
Cymolomia hartigiana (Saxesen, 1840)
Dichelia histrionana (Frolich, 1828)
Dichrorampha acuminatana (Lienig & Zeller, 1846)
Dichrorampha aeratana (Pierce & Metcalfe, 1915)
Dichrorampha agilana (Tengstrom, 1848)
Dichrorampha alpinana (Treitschke, 1830)
Dichrorampha consortana Stephens, 1852
Dichrorampha flavidorsana Knaggs, 1867
Dichrorampha heegerana (Duponchel, 1843)
Dichrorampha incognitana (Kremky & Maslowski, 1933)
Dichrorampha obscuratana (Wolff, 1955)
Dichrorampha petiverella (Linnaeus, 1758)
Dichrorampha plumbagana (Treitschke, 1830)
Dichrorampha plumbana (Scopoli, 1763)
Dichrorampha sedatana Busck, 1906
Dichrorampha senectana Guenee, 1845
Dichrorampha sequana (Hübner, 1799)
Dichrorampha simpliciana (Haworth, 1811)
Dichrorampha sylvicolana Heinemann, 1863
Dichrorampha vancouverana McDunnough, 1935
Ditula angustiorana (Haworth, 1811)
Doloploca punctulana (Denis & Schiffermüller, 1775)
Eana derivana (de La Harpe, 1858)
Eana incanana (Stephens, 1852)
Eana penziana (Thunberg, 1791)
Eana argentana (Clerck, 1759)
Eana osseana (Scopoli, 1763)
Enarmonia formosana (Scopoli, 1763)
Endothenia ericetana (Humphreys & Westwood, 1845)
Endothenia hebesana (Walker, 1863)
Endothenia marginana (Haworth, 1811)
Endothenia nigricostana (Haworth, 1811)
Endothenia oblongana (Haworth, 1811)
Endothenia pullana (Haworth, 1811)
Endothenia quadrimaculana (Haworth, 1811)
Epagoge grotiana (Fabricius, 1781)
Epiblema cirsiana (Zeller, 1843)
Epiblema foenella (Linnaeus, 1758)
Epiblema grandaevana (Lienig & Zeller, 1846)
Epiblema graphana (Treitschke, 1835)
Epiblema inulivora (Meyrick, 1932)
Epiblema junctana (Herrich-Schäffer, 1856)
Epiblema scutulana (Denis & Schiffermüller, 1775)
Epiblema simploniana (Duponchel, 1835)
Epiblema sticticana (Fabricius, 1794)
Epinotia abbreviana (Fabricius, 1794)
Epinotia bilunana (Haworth, 1811)
Epinotia brunnichana (Linnaeus, 1767)
Epinotia caprana (Fabricius, 1798)
Epinotia crenana (Hübner, 1799)
Epinotia cruciana (Linnaeus, 1761)
Epinotia demarniana (Fischer v. Röslerstamm, 1840)
Epinotia fraternana (Haworth, 1811)
Epinotia gimmerthaliana (Lienig & Zeller, 1846)
Epinotia granitana (Herrich-Schäffer, 1851)
Epinotia immundana (Fischer v. Röslerstamm, 1839)
Epinotia indecorana (Zetterstedt, 1839)
Epinotia maculana (Fabricius, 1775)
Epinotia mercuriana (Frolich, 1828)
Epinotia nanana (Treitschke, 1835)
Epinotia nemorivaga (Tengstrom, 1848)
Epinotia nigricana (Herrich-Schäffer, 1851)
Epinotia nisella (Clerck, 1759)
Epinotia pygmaeana (Hübner, 1799)
Epinotia ramella (Linnaeus, 1758)
Epinotia rubiginosana (Herrich-Schäffer, 1851)
Epinotia signatana (Douglas, 1845)
Epinotia solandriana (Linnaeus, 1758)
Epinotia sordidana (Hübner, 1824)
Epinotia subocellana (Donovan, 1806)
Epinotia subsequana (Haworth, 1811)
Epinotia tedella (Clerck, 1759)
Epinotia tenerana (Denis & Schiffermüller, 1775)
Epinotia tetraquetrana (Haworth, 1811)
Epinotia trigonella (Linnaeus, 1758)
Eriopsela quadrana (Hübner, 1813)
Eucosma aemulana (Schlager, 1849)
Eucosma aspidiscana (Hübner, 1817)
Eucosma balatonana (Osthelder, 1937)
Eucosma campoliliana (Denis & Schiffermüller, 1775)
Eucosma cana (Haworth, 1811)
Eucosma conterminana (Guenee, 1845)
Eucosma fulvana Stephens, 1834
Eucosma hohenwartiana (Denis & Schiffermüller, 1775)
Eucosma krygeri (Rebel, 1937)
Eucosma lacteana (Treitschke, 1835)
Eucosma messingiana (Fischer v. Röslerstamm, 1837)
Eucosma metzneriana (Treitschke, 1830)
Eucosma obumbratana (Lienig & Zeller, 1846)
Eucosma pupillana (Clerck, 1759)
Eucosma saussureana (Benander, 1928)
Eucosma scorzonerana (Benander, 1942)
Eucosma suomiana (A. Hoffmann, 1893)
Eucosma tripoliana (Barrett, 1880)
Eucosmomorpha albersana (Hübner, 1813)
Eudemis porphyrana (Hübner, 1799)
Eudemis profundana (Denis & Schiffermüller, 1775)
Eulia ministrana (Linnaeus, 1758)
Eupoecilia ambiguella (Hübner, 1796)
Eupoecilia angustana (Hübner, 1799)
Eupoecilia cebrana (Hübner, 1813)
Eupoecilia sanguisorbana (Herrich-Schäffer, 1856)
Exapate congelatella (Clerck, 1759)
Falseuncaria degreyana (McLachlan, 1869)
Falseuncaria ruficiliana (Haworth, 1811)
Gibberifera simplana (Fischer v. Röslerstamm, 1836)
Grapholita funebrana Treitschke, 1835
Grapholita janthinana (Duponchel, 1843)
Grapholita tenebrosana Duponchel, 1843
Grapholita aureolana Tengstrom, 1848
Grapholita caecana Schlager, 1847
Grapholita compositella (Fabricius, 1775)
Grapholita discretana Wocke, 1861
Grapholita fissana (Frolich, 1828)
Grapholita gemmiferana Treitschke, 1835
Grapholita jungiella (Clerck, 1759)
Grapholita lunulana (Denis & Schiffermüller, 1775)
Grapholita orobana Treitschke, 1830
Grapholita pallifrontana Lienig & Zeller, 1846
Gravitarmata margarotana (Heinemann, 1863)
Gynnidomorpha alismana (Ragonot, 1883)
Gynnidomorpha luridana (Gregson, 1870)
Gynnidomorpha minimana (Caradja, 1916)
Gynnidomorpha permixtana (Denis & Schiffermüller, 1775)
Gynnidomorpha vectisana (Humphreys & Westwood, 1845)
Gypsonoma aceriana (Duponchel, 1843)
Gypsonoma dealbana (Frolich, 1828)
Gypsonoma minutana (Hübner, 1799)
Gypsonoma nitidulana (Lienig & Zeller, 1846)
Gypsonoma oppressana (Treitschke, 1835)
Gypsonoma sociana (Haworth, 1811)
Hedya dimidiana (Clerck, 1759)
Hedya nubiferana (Haworth, 1811)
Hedya ochroleucana (Frolich, 1828)
Hedya pruniana (Hübner, 1799)
Hedya salicella (Linnaeus, 1758)
Lathronympha strigana (Fabricius, 1775)
Lobesia abscisana (Doubleday, 1849)
Lobesia bicinctana (Duponchel, 1844)
Lobesia botrana (Denis & Schiffermüller, 1775)
Lobesia littoralis (Westwood & Humphreys, 1845)
Lobesia reliquana (Hübner, 1825)
Lobesia virulenta Bae & Komai, 1991
Lozotaenia forsterana (Fabricius, 1781)
Metendothenia atropunctana (Zetterstedt, 1839)
Neosphaleroptera nubilana (Hübner, 1799)
Notocelia cynosbatella (Linnaeus, 1758)
Notocelia incarnatana (Hübner, 1800)
Notocelia roborana (Denis & Schiffermüller, 1775)
Notocelia rosaecolana (Doubleday, 1850)
Notocelia tetragonana (Stephens, 1834)
Notocelia trimaculana (Haworth, 1811)
Notocelia uddmanniana (Linnaeus, 1758)
Olethreutes arcuella (Clerck, 1759)
Olindia schumacherana (Fabricius, 1787)
Orthotaenia undulana (Denis & Schiffermüller, 1775)
Pammene agnotana Rebel, 1914
Pammene albuginana (Guenee, 1845)
Pammene argyrana (Hübner, 1799)
Pammene aurana (Fabricius, 1775)
Pammene aurita Razowski, 1991
Pammene clanculana (Tengstrom, 1869)
Pammene fasciana (Linnaeus, 1761)
Pammene gallicana (Guenee, 1845)
Pammene germmana (Hübner, 1799)
Pammene giganteana (Peyerimhoff, 1863)
Pammene herrichiana (Heinemann, 1854)
Pammene ignorata Kuznetsov, 1968
Pammene insulana (Guenee, 1845)
Pammene luedersiana (Sorhagen, 1885)
Pammene obscurana (Stephens, 1834)
Pammene ochsenheimeriana (Lienig & Zeller, 1846)
Pammene populana (Fabricius, 1787)
Pammene regiana (Zeller, 1849)
Pammene rhediella (Clerck, 1759)
Pammene spiniana (Duponchel, 1843)
Pammene splendidulana (Guenee, 1845)
Pammene suspectana (Lienig & Zeller, 1846)
Pandemis cerasana (Hübner, 1786)
Pandemis cinnamomeana (Treitschke, 1830)
Pandemis corylana (Fabricius, 1794)
Pandemis dumetana (Treitschke, 1835)
Pandemis heparana (Denis & Schiffermüller, 1775)
Paramesia gnomana (Clerck, 1759)
Pelochrista caecimaculana (Hübner, 1799)
Pelochrista huebneriana (Lienig & Zeller, 1846)
Pelochrista infidana (Hübner, 1824)
Pelochrista mollitana (Zeller, 1847)
Periclepsis cinctana (Denis & Schiffermüller, 1775)
Phalonidia affinitana (Douglas, 1846)
Phalonidia curvistrigana (Stainton, 1859)
Phalonidia gilvicomana (Zeller, 1847)
Phalonidia manniana (Fischer v. Röslerstamm, 1839)
Phiaris bipunctana (Fabricius, 1794)
Phiaris dissolutana (Stange, 1866)
Phiaris heinrichana (McDunnough, 1927)
Phiaris metallicana (Hübner, 1799)
Phiaris micana (Denis & Schiffermüller, 1775)
Phiaris obsoletana (Zetterstedt, 1839)
Phiaris palustrana (Lienig & Zeller, 1846)
Phiaris schulziana (Fabricius, 1776)
Phiaris septentrionana (Curtis, 1835)
Phiaris turfosana (Herrich-Schäffer, 1851)
Phiaris umbrosana (Freyer, 1842)
Philedone gerningana (Denis & Schiffermüller, 1775)
Philedonides lunana (Thunberg, 1784)
Phtheochroa inopiana (Haworth, 1811)
Phtheochroa schreibersiana (Frolich, 1828)
Phtheochroa sodaliana (Haworth, 1811)
Phtheochroa vulneratana (Zetterstedt, 1839)
Piniphila bifasciana (Haworth, 1811)
Pristerognatha fuligana (Denis & Schiffermüller, 1775)
Pristerognatha penthinana (Guenee, 1845)
Pseudargyrotoza conwagana (Fabricius, 1775)
Pseudococcyx posticana (Zetterstedt, 1839)
Pseudococcyx turionella (Linnaeus, 1758)
Pseudohermenias abietana (Fabricius, 1787)
Pseudosciaphila branderiana (Linnaeus, 1758)
Ptycholoma lecheana (Linnaeus, 1758)
Ptycholomoides aeriferana (Herrich-Schäffer, 1851)
Retinia perangustana (Snellen, 1883)
Retinia resinella (Linnaeus, 1758)
Rhopobota myrtillana (Humphreys & Westwood, 1845)
Rhopobota naevana (Hübner, 1817)
Rhopobota stagnana (Denis & Schiffermüller, 1775)
Rhopobota ustomaculana (Curtis, 1831)
Rhyacionia buoliana (Denis & Schiffermüller, 1775)
Rhyacionia duplana (Hübner, 1813)
Rhyacionia logaea Durrant, 1911
Rhyacionia pinicolana (Doubleday, 1849)
Rhyacionia pinivorana (Lienig & Zeller, 1846)
Selenodes karelica (Tengstrom, 1875)
Sparganothis pilleriana (Denis & Schiffermüller, 1775)
Sparganothis praecana (Kennel, 1900)
Sparganothis rubicundana (Herrich-Schäffer, 1856)
Spatalistis bifasciana (Hübner, 1787)
Spilonota laricana (Heinemann, 1863)
Spilonota ocellana (Denis & Schiffermüller, 1775)
Stictea mygindiana (Denis & Schiffermüller, 1775)
Strophedra nitidana (Fabricius, 1794)
Strophedra weirana (Douglas, 1850)
Syndemis musculana (Hübner, 1799)
Thiodia citrana (Hübner, 1799)
Tortricodes alternella (Denis & Schiffermüller, 1775)
Tortrix viridana Linnaeus, 1758
Xerocnephasia rigana (Sodoffsky, 1829)
Zeiraphera griseana (Hübner, 1799)
Zeiraphera isertana (Fabricius, 1794)
Zeiraphera ratzeburgiana (Saxesen, 1840)
Zeiraphera rufimitrana (Herrich-Schäffer, 1851)

Urodidae
Wockia asperipunctella (Bruand, 1851)

Yponomeutidae
Cedestis gysseleniella Zeller, 1839
Cedestis subfasciella (Stephens, 1834)
Euhyponomeuta stannella (Thunberg, 1788)
Euhyponomeutoides albithoracellus Gaj, 1954
Euhyponomeutoides ribesiella (de Joannis, 1900)
Kessleria fasciapennella (Stainton, 1849)
Ocnerostoma friesei Svensson, 1966
Ocnerostoma piniariella Zeller, 1847
Paraswammerdamia albicapitella (Scharfenberg, 1805)
Paraswammerdamia conspersella (Tengstrom, 1848)
Paraswammerdamia lapponica (W. Petersen, 1932)
Paraswammerdamia nebulella (Goeze, 1783)
Pseudoswammerdamia combinella (Hübner, 1786)
Scythropia crataegella (Linnaeus, 1767)
Swammerdamia caesiella (Hübner, 1796)
Swammerdamia compunctella Herrich-Schäffer, 1855
Swammerdamia passerella (Zetterstedt, 1839)
Swammerdamia pyrella (Villers, 1789)
Yponomeuta cagnagella (Hübner, 1813)
Yponomeuta evonymella (Linnaeus, 1758)
Yponomeuta irrorella (Hübner, 1796)
Yponomeuta malinellus Zeller, 1838
Yponomeuta padella (Linnaeus, 1758)
Yponomeuta plumbella (Denis & Schiffermüller, 1775)
Yponomeuta rorrella (Hübner, 1796)
Yponomeuta sedella Treitschke, 1832
Zelleria hepariella Stainton, 1849

Ypsolophidae
Ochsenheimeria taurella (Denis & Schiffermüller, 1775)
Ochsenheimeria urella Fischer von Röslerstamm, 1842
Ochsenheimeria vacculella Fischer von Röslerstamm, 1842
Ypsolopha alpella (Denis & Schiffermüller, 1775)
Ypsolopha asperella (Linnaeus, 1761)
Ypsolopha dentella (Fabricius, 1775)
Ypsolopha falcella (Denis & Schiffermüller, 1775)
Ypsolopha horridella (Treitschke, 1835)
Ypsolopha lucella (Fabricius, 1775)
Ypsolopha mucronella (Scopoli, 1763)
Ypsolopha nemorella (Linnaeus, 1758)
Ypsolopha parenthesella (Linnaeus, 1761)
Ypsolopha scabrella (Linnaeus, 1761)
Ypsolopha sequella (Clerck, 1759)
Ypsolopha sylvella (Linnaeus, 1767)
Ypsolopha ustella (Clerck, 1759)
Ypsolopha vittella (Linnaeus, 1758)

Zygaenidae
Adscita statices (Linnaeus, 1758)
Zygaena minos (Denis & Schiffermüller, 1775)
Zygaena exulans (Hohenwarth, 1792)
Zygaena filipendulae (Linnaeus, 1758)
Zygaena lonicerae (Scheven, 1777)
Zygaena osterodensis Reiss, 1921
Zygaena viciae (Denis & Schiffermüller, 1775)

See also
List of butterflies of Sweden

External links
Fauna Europaea

Moths
Sweden
Sweden